

111001–111100 

|-bgcolor=#d6d6d6
| 111001 ||  || — || October 16, 2001 || Kitt Peak || Spacewatch || — || align=right | 3.8 km || 
|-id=002 bgcolor=#FA8072
| 111002 || 2001 VN || — || November 6, 2001 || Socorro || LINEAR || H || align=right | 1.5 km || 
|-id=003 bgcolor=#E9E9E9
| 111003 || 2001 VU || — || November 6, 2001 || Socorro || LINEAR || — || align=right | 3.4 km || 
|-id=004 bgcolor=#d6d6d6
| 111004 || 2001 VX || — || November 6, 2001 || Socorro || LINEAR || BRA || align=right | 3.3 km || 
|-id=005 bgcolor=#E9E9E9
| 111005 || 2001 VY || — || November 6, 2001 || Socorro || LINEAR || EUN || align=right | 2.6 km || 
|-id=006 bgcolor=#d6d6d6
| 111006 || 2001 VZ || — || November 6, 2001 || Socorro || LINEAR || AEG || align=right | 6.1 km || 
|-id=007 bgcolor=#E9E9E9
| 111007 ||  || — || November 7, 2001 || Palomar || NEAT || GEF || align=right | 3.6 km || 
|-id=008 bgcolor=#E9E9E9
| 111008 ||  || — || November 9, 2001 || Kitt Peak || Spacewatch || — || align=right | 3.8 km || 
|-id=009 bgcolor=#E9E9E9
| 111009 ||  || — || November 11, 2001 || Kitt Peak || Spacewatch || — || align=right | 3.7 km || 
|-id=010 bgcolor=#d6d6d6
| 111010 ||  || — || November 7, 2001 || Socorro || LINEAR || ALA || align=right | 7.7 km || 
|-id=011 bgcolor=#E9E9E9
| 111011 ||  || — || November 9, 2001 || Socorro || LINEAR || — || align=right | 4.8 km || 
|-id=012 bgcolor=#d6d6d6
| 111012 ||  || — || November 9, 2001 || Socorro || LINEAR || KOR || align=right | 2.2 km || 
|-id=013 bgcolor=#E9E9E9
| 111013 ||  || — || November 9, 2001 || Socorro || LINEAR || — || align=right | 3.2 km || 
|-id=014 bgcolor=#d6d6d6
| 111014 ||  || — || November 9, 2001 || Socorro || LINEAR || KOR || align=right | 2.4 km || 
|-id=015 bgcolor=#d6d6d6
| 111015 ||  || — || November 9, 2001 || Socorro || LINEAR || — || align=right | 4.3 km || 
|-id=016 bgcolor=#E9E9E9
| 111016 ||  || — || November 9, 2001 || Socorro || LINEAR || — || align=right | 3.9 km || 
|-id=017 bgcolor=#d6d6d6
| 111017 ||  || — || November 9, 2001 || Socorro || LINEAR || — || align=right | 5.1 km || 
|-id=018 bgcolor=#E9E9E9
| 111018 ||  || — || November 10, 2001 || Socorro || LINEAR || MAR || align=right | 2.6 km || 
|-id=019 bgcolor=#E9E9E9
| 111019 ||  || — || November 10, 2001 || Socorro || LINEAR || MAR || align=right | 2.3 km || 
|-id=020 bgcolor=#E9E9E9
| 111020 ||  || — || November 10, 2001 || Socorro || LINEAR || — || align=right | 2.9 km || 
|-id=021 bgcolor=#E9E9E9
| 111021 ||  || — || November 10, 2001 || Socorro || LINEAR || EUN || align=right | 3.2 km || 
|-id=022 bgcolor=#E9E9E9
| 111022 ||  || — || November 10, 2001 || Socorro || LINEAR || — || align=right | 4.4 km || 
|-id=023 bgcolor=#E9E9E9
| 111023 ||  || — || November 10, 2001 || Socorro || LINEAR || — || align=right | 2.5 km || 
|-id=024 bgcolor=#d6d6d6
| 111024 ||  || — || November 10, 2001 || Socorro || LINEAR || — || align=right | 4.3 km || 
|-id=025 bgcolor=#d6d6d6
| 111025 ||  || — || November 7, 2001 || Palomar || NEAT || — || align=right | 7.1 km || 
|-id=026 bgcolor=#E9E9E9
| 111026 ||  || — || November 9, 2001 || Socorro || LINEAR || — || align=right | 2.7 km || 
|-id=027 bgcolor=#d6d6d6
| 111027 ||  || — || November 9, 2001 || Socorro || LINEAR || — || align=right | 7.4 km || 
|-id=028 bgcolor=#E9E9E9
| 111028 ||  || — || November 9, 2001 || Socorro || LINEAR || RAF || align=right | 2.5 km || 
|-id=029 bgcolor=#d6d6d6
| 111029 ||  || — || November 9, 2001 || Socorro || LINEAR || 7:4 || align=right | 8.0 km || 
|-id=030 bgcolor=#E9E9E9
| 111030 ||  || — || November 9, 2001 || Socorro || LINEAR || — || align=right | 1.9 km || 
|-id=031 bgcolor=#E9E9E9
| 111031 ||  || — || November 9, 2001 || Socorro || LINEAR || — || align=right | 2.4 km || 
|-id=032 bgcolor=#d6d6d6
| 111032 ||  || — || November 9, 2001 || Socorro || LINEAR || KOR || align=right | 2.9 km || 
|-id=033 bgcolor=#E9E9E9
| 111033 ||  || — || November 9, 2001 || Socorro || LINEAR || — || align=right | 1.9 km || 
|-id=034 bgcolor=#E9E9E9
| 111034 ||  || — || November 9, 2001 || Socorro || LINEAR || — || align=right | 4.6 km || 
|-id=035 bgcolor=#E9E9E9
| 111035 ||  || — || November 9, 2001 || Socorro || LINEAR || — || align=right | 3.1 km || 
|-id=036 bgcolor=#E9E9E9
| 111036 ||  || — || November 9, 2001 || Socorro || LINEAR || — || align=right | 3.9 km || 
|-id=037 bgcolor=#E9E9E9
| 111037 ||  || — || November 9, 2001 || Socorro || LINEAR || HEN || align=right | 3.9 km || 
|-id=038 bgcolor=#d6d6d6
| 111038 ||  || — || November 9, 2001 || Socorro || LINEAR || KOR || align=right | 3.1 km || 
|-id=039 bgcolor=#E9E9E9
| 111039 ||  || — || November 9, 2001 || Socorro || LINEAR || — || align=right | 3.3 km || 
|-id=040 bgcolor=#E9E9E9
| 111040 ||  || — || November 9, 2001 || Socorro || LINEAR || — || align=right | 2.3 km || 
|-id=041 bgcolor=#E9E9E9
| 111041 ||  || — || November 9, 2001 || Socorro || LINEAR || GEF || align=right | 2.6 km || 
|-id=042 bgcolor=#d6d6d6
| 111042 ||  || — || November 9, 2001 || Socorro || LINEAR || — || align=right | 7.3 km || 
|-id=043 bgcolor=#d6d6d6
| 111043 ||  || — || November 9, 2001 || Socorro || LINEAR || — || align=right | 4.2 km || 
|-id=044 bgcolor=#E9E9E9
| 111044 ||  || — || November 9, 2001 || Socorro || LINEAR || — || align=right | 5.1 km || 
|-id=045 bgcolor=#E9E9E9
| 111045 ||  || — || November 9, 2001 || Socorro || LINEAR || — || align=right | 4.3 km || 
|-id=046 bgcolor=#d6d6d6
| 111046 ||  || — || November 9, 2001 || Socorro || LINEAR || — || align=right | 4.1 km || 
|-id=047 bgcolor=#E9E9E9
| 111047 ||  || — || November 9, 2001 || Socorro || LINEAR || — || align=right | 1.8 km || 
|-id=048 bgcolor=#d6d6d6
| 111048 ||  || — || November 9, 2001 || Socorro || LINEAR || KOR || align=right | 3.4 km || 
|-id=049 bgcolor=#E9E9E9
| 111049 ||  || — || November 9, 2001 || Socorro || LINEAR || — || align=right | 4.3 km || 
|-id=050 bgcolor=#fefefe
| 111050 ||  || — || November 9, 2001 || Socorro || LINEAR || — || align=right | 1.3 km || 
|-id=051 bgcolor=#fefefe
| 111051 ||  || — || November 9, 2001 || Socorro || LINEAR || — || align=right | 1.5 km || 
|-id=052 bgcolor=#E9E9E9
| 111052 ||  || — || November 9, 2001 || Socorro || LINEAR || HEN || align=right | 1.9 km || 
|-id=053 bgcolor=#E9E9E9
| 111053 ||  || — || November 9, 2001 || Socorro || LINEAR || NEM || align=right | 4.5 km || 
|-id=054 bgcolor=#E9E9E9
| 111054 ||  || — || November 9, 2001 || Socorro || LINEAR || — || align=right | 2.7 km || 
|-id=055 bgcolor=#d6d6d6
| 111055 ||  || — || November 9, 2001 || Socorro || LINEAR || KOR || align=right | 2.8 km || 
|-id=056 bgcolor=#E9E9E9
| 111056 ||  || — || November 9, 2001 || Socorro || LINEAR || — || align=right | 3.6 km || 
|-id=057 bgcolor=#E9E9E9
| 111057 ||  || — || November 9, 2001 || Socorro || LINEAR || — || align=right | 4.2 km || 
|-id=058 bgcolor=#d6d6d6
| 111058 ||  || — || November 9, 2001 || Socorro || LINEAR || KOR || align=right | 3.0 km || 
|-id=059 bgcolor=#E9E9E9
| 111059 ||  || — || November 9, 2001 || Socorro || LINEAR || — || align=right | 3.6 km || 
|-id=060 bgcolor=#d6d6d6
| 111060 ||  || — || November 9, 2001 || Socorro || LINEAR || — || align=right | 6.4 km || 
|-id=061 bgcolor=#d6d6d6
| 111061 ||  || — || November 9, 2001 || Socorro || LINEAR || TIR || align=right | 6.5 km || 
|-id=062 bgcolor=#E9E9E9
| 111062 ||  || — || November 9, 2001 || Socorro || LINEAR || INO || align=right | 2.9 km || 
|-id=063 bgcolor=#E9E9E9
| 111063 ||  || — || November 9, 2001 || Socorro || LINEAR || — || align=right | 4.2 km || 
|-id=064 bgcolor=#E9E9E9
| 111064 ||  || — || November 9, 2001 || Socorro || LINEAR || — || align=right | 8.4 km || 
|-id=065 bgcolor=#E9E9E9
| 111065 ||  || — || November 9, 2001 || Socorro || LINEAR || — || align=right | 2.7 km || 
|-id=066 bgcolor=#E9E9E9
| 111066 ||  || — || November 9, 2001 || Socorro || LINEAR || — || align=right | 7.0 km || 
|-id=067 bgcolor=#d6d6d6
| 111067 ||  || — || November 9, 2001 || Socorro || LINEAR || EOS || align=right | 5.3 km || 
|-id=068 bgcolor=#E9E9E9
| 111068 ||  || — || November 9, 2001 || Socorro || LINEAR || ADE || align=right | 6.3 km || 
|-id=069 bgcolor=#E9E9E9
| 111069 ||  || — || November 9, 2001 || Socorro || LINEAR || — || align=right | 5.9 km || 
|-id=070 bgcolor=#E9E9E9
| 111070 ||  || — || November 10, 2001 || Socorro || LINEAR || — || align=right | 3.0 km || 
|-id=071 bgcolor=#E9E9E9
| 111071 ||  || — || November 10, 2001 || Socorro || LINEAR || — || align=right | 3.3 km || 
|-id=072 bgcolor=#E9E9E9
| 111072 ||  || — || November 10, 2001 || Socorro || LINEAR || — || align=right | 3.2 km || 
|-id=073 bgcolor=#E9E9E9
| 111073 ||  || — || November 10, 2001 || Socorro || LINEAR || — || align=right | 5.7 km || 
|-id=074 bgcolor=#E9E9E9
| 111074 ||  || — || November 10, 2001 || Socorro || LINEAR || PADslow || align=right | 3.0 km || 
|-id=075 bgcolor=#E9E9E9
| 111075 ||  || — || November 10, 2001 || Socorro || LINEAR || GEF || align=right | 2.5 km || 
|-id=076 bgcolor=#E9E9E9
| 111076 ||  || — || November 10, 2001 || Socorro || LINEAR || — || align=right | 2.1 km || 
|-id=077 bgcolor=#E9E9E9
| 111077 ||  || — || November 10, 2001 || Socorro || LINEAR || — || align=right | 4.5 km || 
|-id=078 bgcolor=#d6d6d6
| 111078 ||  || — || November 10, 2001 || Socorro || LINEAR || 628 || align=right | 4.9 km || 
|-id=079 bgcolor=#E9E9E9
| 111079 ||  || — || November 10, 2001 || Socorro || LINEAR || — || align=right | 3.4 km || 
|-id=080 bgcolor=#E9E9E9
| 111080 ||  || — || November 10, 2001 || Socorro || LINEAR || — || align=right | 4.4 km || 
|-id=081 bgcolor=#E9E9E9
| 111081 ||  || — || November 10, 2001 || Socorro || LINEAR || — || align=right | 3.5 km || 
|-id=082 bgcolor=#E9E9E9
| 111082 ||  || — || November 10, 2001 || Socorro || LINEAR || — || align=right | 3.3 km || 
|-id=083 bgcolor=#E9E9E9
| 111083 ||  || — || November 10, 2001 || Socorro || LINEAR || — || align=right | 2.3 km || 
|-id=084 bgcolor=#E9E9E9
| 111084 ||  || — || November 10, 2001 || Socorro || LINEAR || MAR || align=right | 2.3 km || 
|-id=085 bgcolor=#E9E9E9
| 111085 ||  || — || November 10, 2001 || Socorro || LINEAR || WIT || align=right | 2.2 km || 
|-id=086 bgcolor=#E9E9E9
| 111086 ||  || — || November 10, 2001 || Socorro || LINEAR || — || align=right | 4.8 km || 
|-id=087 bgcolor=#E9E9E9
| 111087 ||  || — || November 10, 2001 || Socorro || LINEAR || — || align=right | 4.3 km || 
|-id=088 bgcolor=#E9E9E9
| 111088 ||  || — || November 10, 2001 || Socorro || LINEAR || — || align=right | 4.7 km || 
|-id=089 bgcolor=#E9E9E9
| 111089 ||  || — || November 10, 2001 || Socorro || LINEAR || ADE || align=right | 5.4 km || 
|-id=090 bgcolor=#E9E9E9
| 111090 ||  || — || November 10, 2001 || Socorro || LINEAR || — || align=right | 3.5 km || 
|-id=091 bgcolor=#E9E9E9
| 111091 ||  || — || November 10, 2001 || Socorro || LINEAR || — || align=right | 3.7 km || 
|-id=092 bgcolor=#E9E9E9
| 111092 ||  || — || November 10, 2001 || Socorro || LINEAR || — || align=right | 4.8 km || 
|-id=093 bgcolor=#E9E9E9
| 111093 ||  || — || November 10, 2001 || Socorro || LINEAR || GEF || align=right | 2.8 km || 
|-id=094 bgcolor=#E9E9E9
| 111094 ||  || — || November 10, 2001 || Socorro || LINEAR || — || align=right | 2.8 km || 
|-id=095 bgcolor=#d6d6d6
| 111095 ||  || — || November 10, 2001 || Socorro || LINEAR || — || align=right | 5.5 km || 
|-id=096 bgcolor=#fefefe
| 111096 ||  || — || November 10, 2001 || Socorro || LINEAR || V || align=right | 1.2 km || 
|-id=097 bgcolor=#E9E9E9
| 111097 ||  || — || November 11, 2001 || Socorro || LINEAR || — || align=right | 2.1 km || 
|-id=098 bgcolor=#d6d6d6
| 111098 ||  || — || November 11, 2001 || Socorro || LINEAR || — || align=right | 3.5 km || 
|-id=099 bgcolor=#d6d6d6
| 111099 ||  || — || November 11, 2001 || Socorro || LINEAR || — || align=right | 7.2 km || 
|-id=100 bgcolor=#E9E9E9
| 111100 ||  || — || November 11, 2001 || Socorro || LINEAR || — || align=right | 3.6 km || 
|}

111101–111200 

|-bgcolor=#d6d6d6
| 111101 ||  || — || November 11, 2001 || Socorro || LINEAR || — || align=right | 5.3 km || 
|-id=102 bgcolor=#E9E9E9
| 111102 ||  || — || November 12, 2001 || Socorro || LINEAR || MAR || align=right | 2.4 km || 
|-id=103 bgcolor=#E9E9E9
| 111103 ||  || — || November 14, 2001 || Kitt Peak || Spacewatch || — || align=right | 3.1 km || 
|-id=104 bgcolor=#E9E9E9
| 111104 ||  || — || November 11, 2001 || Palomar || NEAT || — || align=right | 2.3 km || 
|-id=105 bgcolor=#d6d6d6
| 111105 ||  || — || November 11, 2001 || Kitt Peak || Spacewatch || — || align=right | 5.3 km || 
|-id=106 bgcolor=#fefefe
| 111106 ||  || — || November 15, 2001 || Socorro || LINEAR || H || align=right | 1.4 km || 
|-id=107 bgcolor=#E9E9E9
| 111107 ||  || — || November 9, 2001 || Palomar || NEAT || — || align=right | 4.1 km || 
|-id=108 bgcolor=#E9E9E9
| 111108 ||  || — || November 9, 2001 || Palomar || NEAT || — || align=right | 2.2 km || 
|-id=109 bgcolor=#E9E9E9
| 111109 ||  || — || November 10, 2001 || Palomar || NEAT || — || align=right | 5.8 km || 
|-id=110 bgcolor=#E9E9E9
| 111110 ||  || — || November 10, 2001 || Socorro || LINEAR || — || align=right | 3.4 km || 
|-id=111 bgcolor=#E9E9E9
| 111111 ||  || — || November 12, 2001 || Socorro || LINEAR || — || align=right | 3.4 km || 
|-id=112 bgcolor=#E9E9E9
| 111112 ||  || — || November 12, 2001 || Socorro || LINEAR || — || align=right | 4.8 km || 
|-id=113 bgcolor=#C2FFFF
| 111113 ||  || — || November 12, 2001 || Socorro || LINEAR || L5 || align=right | 15 km || 
|-id=114 bgcolor=#E9E9E9
| 111114 ||  || — || November 13, 2001 || Socorro || LINEAR || MAR || align=right | 2.5 km || 
|-id=115 bgcolor=#E9E9E9
| 111115 ||  || — || November 15, 2001 || Socorro || LINEAR || ADE || align=right | 6.0 km || 
|-id=116 bgcolor=#E9E9E9
| 111116 ||  || — || November 15, 2001 || Socorro || LINEAR || — || align=right | 3.9 km || 
|-id=117 bgcolor=#E9E9E9
| 111117 ||  || — || November 11, 2001 || Kitt Peak || Spacewatch || NEM || align=right | 2.2 km || 
|-id=118 bgcolor=#E9E9E9
| 111118 ||  || — || November 12, 2001 || Haleakala || NEAT || NEM || align=right | 3.9 km || 
|-id=119 bgcolor=#E9E9E9
| 111119 ||  || — || November 15, 2001 || Palomar || NEAT || — || align=right | 3.8 km || 
|-id=120 bgcolor=#E9E9E9
| 111120 ||  || — || November 12, 2001 || Anderson Mesa || LONEOS || — || align=right | 4.7 km || 
|-id=121 bgcolor=#d6d6d6
| 111121 ||  || — || November 13, 2001 || Socorro || LINEAR || — || align=right | 4.9 km || 
|-id=122 bgcolor=#E9E9E9
| 111122 ||  || — || November 15, 2001 || Socorro || LINEAR || — || align=right | 4.2 km || 
|-id=123 bgcolor=#E9E9E9
| 111123 ||  || — || November 15, 2001 || Socorro || LINEAR || — || align=right | 5.3 km || 
|-id=124 bgcolor=#E9E9E9
| 111124 ||  || — || November 15, 2001 || Socorro || LINEAR || — || align=right | 3.4 km || 
|-id=125 bgcolor=#d6d6d6
| 111125 ||  || — || November 15, 2001 || Socorro || LINEAR || AEG || align=right | 6.3 km || 
|-id=126 bgcolor=#d6d6d6
| 111126 ||  || — || November 15, 2001 || Socorro || LINEAR || EOS || align=right | 3.8 km || 
|-id=127 bgcolor=#E9E9E9
| 111127 ||  || — || November 15, 2001 || Socorro || LINEAR || EUN || align=right | 2.2 km || 
|-id=128 bgcolor=#E9E9E9
| 111128 ||  || — || November 15, 2001 || Socorro || LINEAR || — || align=right | 3.6 km || 
|-id=129 bgcolor=#E9E9E9
| 111129 ||  || — || November 15, 2001 || Socorro || LINEAR || MIT || align=right | 5.0 km || 
|-id=130 bgcolor=#E9E9E9
| 111130 ||  || — || November 15, 2001 || Socorro || LINEAR || — || align=right | 3.4 km || 
|-id=131 bgcolor=#E9E9E9
| 111131 ||  || — || November 15, 2001 || Socorro || LINEAR || — || align=right | 3.2 km || 
|-id=132 bgcolor=#E9E9E9
| 111132 ||  || — || November 15, 2001 || Socorro || LINEAR || — || align=right | 4.0 km || 
|-id=133 bgcolor=#E9E9E9
| 111133 ||  || — || November 15, 2001 || Socorro || LINEAR || — || align=right | 4.6 km || 
|-id=134 bgcolor=#d6d6d6
| 111134 ||  || — || November 15, 2001 || Socorro || LINEAR || — || align=right | 7.2 km || 
|-id=135 bgcolor=#E9E9E9
| 111135 ||  || — || November 15, 2001 || Socorro || LINEAR || — || align=right | 2.8 km || 
|-id=136 bgcolor=#E9E9E9
| 111136 ||  || — || November 15, 2001 || Socorro || LINEAR || ADE || align=right | 3.6 km || 
|-id=137 bgcolor=#E9E9E9
| 111137 ||  || — || November 15, 2001 || Socorro || LINEAR || — || align=right | 3.2 km || 
|-id=138 bgcolor=#d6d6d6
| 111138 ||  || — || November 15, 2001 || Socorro || LINEAR || — || align=right | 5.2 km || 
|-id=139 bgcolor=#d6d6d6
| 111139 ||  || — || November 15, 2001 || Socorro || LINEAR || EOS || align=right | 3.7 km || 
|-id=140 bgcolor=#E9E9E9
| 111140 ||  || — || November 15, 2001 || Socorro || LINEAR || EUN || align=right | 2.5 km || 
|-id=141 bgcolor=#E9E9E9
| 111141 ||  || — || November 15, 2001 || Socorro || LINEAR || — || align=right | 2.6 km || 
|-id=142 bgcolor=#E9E9E9
| 111142 ||  || — || November 15, 2001 || Socorro || LINEAR || — || align=right | 5.4 km || 
|-id=143 bgcolor=#fefefe
| 111143 ||  || — || November 15, 2001 || Socorro || LINEAR || H || align=right | 1.2 km || 
|-id=144 bgcolor=#d6d6d6
| 111144 ||  || — || November 15, 2001 || Socorro || LINEAR || SAN || align=right | 3.8 km || 
|-id=145 bgcolor=#d6d6d6
| 111145 ||  || — || November 15, 2001 || Socorro || LINEAR || — || align=right | 6.8 km || 
|-id=146 bgcolor=#E9E9E9
| 111146 ||  || — || November 15, 2001 || Socorro || LINEAR || JUN || align=right | 3.9 km || 
|-id=147 bgcolor=#E9E9E9
| 111147 ||  || — || November 15, 2001 || Socorro || LINEAR || — || align=right | 4.5 km || 
|-id=148 bgcolor=#E9E9E9
| 111148 ||  || — || November 15, 2001 || Socorro || LINEAR || — || align=right | 2.6 km || 
|-id=149 bgcolor=#E9E9E9
| 111149 ||  || — || November 12, 2001 || Socorro || LINEAR || PAD || align=right | 4.4 km || 
|-id=150 bgcolor=#d6d6d6
| 111150 ||  || — || November 12, 2001 || Socorro || LINEAR || 628 || align=right | 3.9 km || 
|-id=151 bgcolor=#E9E9E9
| 111151 ||  || — || November 12, 2001 || Socorro || LINEAR || — || align=right | 4.6 km || 
|-id=152 bgcolor=#E9E9E9
| 111152 ||  || — || November 12, 2001 || Socorro || LINEAR || — || align=right | 2.9 km || 
|-id=153 bgcolor=#E9E9E9
| 111153 ||  || — || November 12, 2001 || Socorro || LINEAR || — || align=right | 4.1 km || 
|-id=154 bgcolor=#E9E9E9
| 111154 ||  || — || November 12, 2001 || Socorro || LINEAR || — || align=right | 2.1 km || 
|-id=155 bgcolor=#E9E9E9
| 111155 ||  || — || November 12, 2001 || Socorro || LINEAR || — || align=right | 4.2 km || 
|-id=156 bgcolor=#E9E9E9
| 111156 ||  || — || November 12, 2001 || Socorro || LINEAR || — || align=right | 3.6 km || 
|-id=157 bgcolor=#E9E9E9
| 111157 ||  || — || November 12, 2001 || Socorro || LINEAR || — || align=right | 3.6 km || 
|-id=158 bgcolor=#d6d6d6
| 111158 ||  || — || November 12, 2001 || Socorro || LINEAR || 628 || align=right | 3.1 km || 
|-id=159 bgcolor=#E9E9E9
| 111159 ||  || — || November 12, 2001 || Socorro || LINEAR || — || align=right | 2.5 km || 
|-id=160 bgcolor=#d6d6d6
| 111160 ||  || — || November 12, 2001 || Socorro || LINEAR || THM || align=right | 4.1 km || 
|-id=161 bgcolor=#E9E9E9
| 111161 ||  || — || November 12, 2001 || Socorro || LINEAR || NEM || align=right | 4.0 km || 
|-id=162 bgcolor=#d6d6d6
| 111162 ||  || — || November 12, 2001 || Socorro || LINEAR || KOR || align=right | 2.2 km || 
|-id=163 bgcolor=#E9E9E9
| 111163 ||  || — || November 12, 2001 || Socorro || LINEAR || GEF || align=right | 2.3 km || 
|-id=164 bgcolor=#E9E9E9
| 111164 ||  || — || November 12, 2001 || Socorro || LINEAR || — || align=right | 3.7 km || 
|-id=165 bgcolor=#E9E9E9
| 111165 ||  || — || November 12, 2001 || Socorro || LINEAR || NEM || align=right | 5.0 km || 
|-id=166 bgcolor=#d6d6d6
| 111166 ||  || — || November 12, 2001 || Socorro || LINEAR || KOR || align=right | 2.5 km || 
|-id=167 bgcolor=#E9E9E9
| 111167 ||  || — || November 12, 2001 || Socorro || LINEAR || HEN || align=right | 2.2 km || 
|-id=168 bgcolor=#E9E9E9
| 111168 ||  || — || November 12, 2001 || Socorro || LINEAR || — || align=right | 2.2 km || 
|-id=169 bgcolor=#E9E9E9
| 111169 ||  || — || November 12, 2001 || Socorro || LINEAR || — || align=right | 5.2 km || 
|-id=170 bgcolor=#E9E9E9
| 111170 ||  || — || November 12, 2001 || Socorro || LINEAR || — || align=right | 3.9 km || 
|-id=171 bgcolor=#E9E9E9
| 111171 ||  || — || November 12, 2001 || Socorro || LINEAR || — || align=right | 3.5 km || 
|-id=172 bgcolor=#E9E9E9
| 111172 ||  || — || November 15, 2001 || Palomar || NEAT || — || align=right | 2.0 km || 
|-id=173 bgcolor=#E9E9E9
| 111173 ||  || — || November 13, 2001 || Haleakala || NEAT || — || align=right | 4.2 km || 
|-id=174 bgcolor=#E9E9E9
| 111174 ||  || — || November 13, 2001 || Haleakala || NEAT || — || align=right | 5.0 km || 
|-id=175 bgcolor=#E9E9E9
| 111175 ||  || — || November 15, 2001 || Palomar || NEAT || NEM || align=right | 3.5 km || 
|-id=176 bgcolor=#E9E9E9
| 111176 ||  || — || November 15, 2001 || Palomar || NEAT || MAR || align=right | 2.9 km || 
|-id=177 bgcolor=#E9E9E9
| 111177 ||  || — || November 11, 2001 || Anderson Mesa || LONEOS || — || align=right | 4.5 km || 
|-id=178 bgcolor=#E9E9E9
| 111178 ||  || — || November 11, 2001 || Kitt Peak || Spacewatch || DOR || align=right | 4.4 km || 
|-id=179 bgcolor=#E9E9E9
| 111179 || 2001 WG || — || November 16, 2001 || Bisei SG Center || BATTeRS || — || align=right | 2.8 km || 
|-id=180 bgcolor=#E9E9E9
| 111180 ||  || — || November 16, 2001 || Kitt Peak || Spacewatch || HEN || align=right | 1.8 km || 
|-id=181 bgcolor=#d6d6d6
| 111181 ||  || — || November 17, 2001 || Kitt Peak || Spacewatch || — || align=right | 4.9 km || 
|-id=182 bgcolor=#E9E9E9
| 111182 ||  || — || November 19, 2001 || Oizumi || T. Kobayashi || — || align=right | 3.9 km || 
|-id=183 bgcolor=#E9E9E9
| 111183 ||  || — || November 17, 2001 || Haleakala || NEAT || MAR || align=right | 2.0 km || 
|-id=184 bgcolor=#d6d6d6
| 111184 ||  || — || November 17, 2001 || Socorro || LINEAR || HYG || align=right | 4.7 km || 
|-id=185 bgcolor=#d6d6d6
| 111185 ||  || — || November 17, 2001 || Socorro || LINEAR || KOR || align=right | 2.3 km || 
|-id=186 bgcolor=#E9E9E9
| 111186 ||  || — || November 17, 2001 || Socorro || LINEAR || — || align=right | 3.4 km || 
|-id=187 bgcolor=#E9E9E9
| 111187 ||  || — || November 17, 2001 || Socorro || LINEAR || — || align=right | 2.5 km || 
|-id=188 bgcolor=#E9E9E9
| 111188 ||  || — || November 17, 2001 || Socorro || LINEAR || AGN || align=right | 2.7 km || 
|-id=189 bgcolor=#E9E9E9
| 111189 ||  || — || November 17, 2001 || Socorro || LINEAR || AEO || align=right | 2.4 km || 
|-id=190 bgcolor=#E9E9E9
| 111190 ||  || — || November 17, 2001 || Socorro || LINEAR || — || align=right | 3.1 km || 
|-id=191 bgcolor=#E9E9E9
| 111191 ||  || — || November 26, 2001 || Socorro || LINEAR || HNS || align=right | 3.3 km || 
|-id=192 bgcolor=#E9E9E9
| 111192 ||  || — || November 17, 2001 || Socorro || LINEAR || — || align=right | 3.5 km || 
|-id=193 bgcolor=#E9E9E9
| 111193 ||  || — || November 17, 2001 || Socorro || LINEAR || HEN || align=right | 2.8 km || 
|-id=194 bgcolor=#E9E9E9
| 111194 ||  || — || November 17, 2001 || Socorro || LINEAR || — || align=right | 2.9 km || 
|-id=195 bgcolor=#E9E9E9
| 111195 ||  || — || November 17, 2001 || Socorro || LINEAR || HEN || align=right | 2.0 km || 
|-id=196 bgcolor=#E9E9E9
| 111196 ||  || — || November 17, 2001 || Socorro || LINEAR || — || align=right | 2.1 km || 
|-id=197 bgcolor=#E9E9E9
| 111197 ||  || — || November 17, 2001 || Socorro || LINEAR || — || align=right | 3.2 km || 
|-id=198 bgcolor=#C2FFFF
| 111198 ||  || — || November 18, 2001 || Socorro || LINEAR || L5 || align=right | 12 km || 
|-id=199 bgcolor=#d6d6d6
| 111199 ||  || — || November 18, 2001 || Socorro || LINEAR || SAN || align=right | 4.7 km || 
|-id=200 bgcolor=#fefefe
| 111200 ||  || — || November 27, 2001 || Socorro || LINEAR || H || align=right | 1.2 km || 
|}

111201–111300 

|-bgcolor=#d6d6d6
| 111201 ||  || — || November 18, 2001 || Kitt Peak || Spacewatch || KAR || align=right | 2.1 km || 
|-id=202 bgcolor=#E9E9E9
| 111202 ||  || — || November 18, 2001 || Kitt Peak || Spacewatch || — || align=right | 4.1 km || 
|-id=203 bgcolor=#E9E9E9
| 111203 ||  || — || November 17, 2001 || Socorro || LINEAR || — || align=right | 2.4 km || 
|-id=204 bgcolor=#E9E9E9
| 111204 ||  || — || November 17, 2001 || Socorro || LINEAR || — || align=right | 4.2 km || 
|-id=205 bgcolor=#E9E9E9
| 111205 ||  || — || November 17, 2001 || Socorro || LINEAR || — || align=right | 2.6 km || 
|-id=206 bgcolor=#fefefe
| 111206 ||  || — || November 17, 2001 || Socorro || LINEAR || — || align=right | 1.4 km || 
|-id=207 bgcolor=#E9E9E9
| 111207 ||  || — || November 17, 2001 || Socorro || LINEAR || — || align=right | 1.7 km || 
|-id=208 bgcolor=#E9E9E9
| 111208 ||  || — || November 17, 2001 || Socorro || LINEAR || — || align=right | 5.2 km || 
|-id=209 bgcolor=#fefefe
| 111209 ||  || — || November 17, 2001 || Socorro || LINEAR || — || align=right | 1.3 km || 
|-id=210 bgcolor=#E9E9E9
| 111210 ||  || — || November 17, 2001 || Socorro || LINEAR || — || align=right | 3.3 km || 
|-id=211 bgcolor=#fefefe
| 111211 ||  || — || November 17, 2001 || Socorro || LINEAR || — || align=right | 1.6 km || 
|-id=212 bgcolor=#E9E9E9
| 111212 ||  || — || November 17, 2001 || Socorro || LINEAR || — || align=right | 2.4 km || 
|-id=213 bgcolor=#d6d6d6
| 111213 ||  || — || November 17, 2001 || Socorro || LINEAR || — || align=right | 3.9 km || 
|-id=214 bgcolor=#E9E9E9
| 111214 ||  || — || November 17, 2001 || Socorro || LINEAR || PAD || align=right | 3.2 km || 
|-id=215 bgcolor=#E9E9E9
| 111215 ||  || — || November 17, 2001 || Socorro || LINEAR || — || align=right | 4.6 km || 
|-id=216 bgcolor=#E9E9E9
| 111216 ||  || — || November 17, 2001 || Socorro || LINEAR || — || align=right | 2.0 km || 
|-id=217 bgcolor=#E9E9E9
| 111217 ||  || — || November 17, 2001 || Socorro || LINEAR || — || align=right | 2.2 km || 
|-id=218 bgcolor=#E9E9E9
| 111218 ||  || — || November 17, 2001 || Socorro || LINEAR || — || align=right | 1.9 km || 
|-id=219 bgcolor=#E9E9E9
| 111219 ||  || — || November 17, 2001 || Socorro || LINEAR || — || align=right | 6.2 km || 
|-id=220 bgcolor=#E9E9E9
| 111220 ||  || — || November 17, 2001 || Socorro || LINEAR || — || align=right | 4.8 km || 
|-id=221 bgcolor=#E9E9E9
| 111221 ||  || — || November 17, 2001 || Socorro || LINEAR || — || align=right | 5.0 km || 
|-id=222 bgcolor=#E9E9E9
| 111222 ||  || — || November 17, 2001 || Socorro || LINEAR || CLO || align=right | 6.6 km || 
|-id=223 bgcolor=#E9E9E9
| 111223 ||  || — || November 17, 2001 || Socorro || LINEAR || — || align=right | 6.9 km || 
|-id=224 bgcolor=#E9E9E9
| 111224 ||  || — || November 18, 2001 || Socorro || LINEAR || — || align=right | 4.0 km || 
|-id=225 bgcolor=#d6d6d6
| 111225 ||  || — || November 18, 2001 || Socorro || LINEAR || KOR || align=right | 2.5 km || 
|-id=226 bgcolor=#d6d6d6
| 111226 ||  || — || November 19, 2001 || Anderson Mesa || LONEOS || — || align=right | 5.3 km || 
|-id=227 bgcolor=#E9E9E9
| 111227 ||  || — || November 19, 2001 || Socorro || LINEAR || HEN || align=right | 1.7 km || 
|-id=228 bgcolor=#E9E9E9
| 111228 ||  || — || November 19, 2001 || Socorro || LINEAR || PAD || align=right | 3.8 km || 
|-id=229 bgcolor=#E9E9E9
| 111229 ||  || — || November 19, 2001 || Socorro || LINEAR || — || align=right | 3.9 km || 
|-id=230 bgcolor=#d6d6d6
| 111230 ||  || — || November 19, 2001 || Socorro || LINEAR || — || align=right | 4.0 km || 
|-id=231 bgcolor=#C2FFFF
| 111231 ||  || — || November 19, 2001 || Socorro || LINEAR || L5 || align=right | 13 km || 
|-id=232 bgcolor=#E9E9E9
| 111232 ||  || — || November 19, 2001 || Socorro || LINEAR || — || align=right | 2.4 km || 
|-id=233 bgcolor=#d6d6d6
| 111233 ||  || — || November 20, 2001 || Socorro || LINEAR || — || align=right | 4.8 km || 
|-id=234 bgcolor=#E9E9E9
| 111234 ||  || — || November 21, 2001 || Socorro || LINEAR || — || align=right | 3.5 km || 
|-id=235 bgcolor=#E9E9E9
| 111235 ||  || — || November 21, 2001 || Socorro || LINEAR || — || align=right | 3.4 km || 
|-id=236 bgcolor=#E9E9E9
| 111236 ||  || — || November 21, 2001 || Socorro || LINEAR || — || align=right | 5.0 km || 
|-id=237 bgcolor=#E9E9E9
| 111237 ||  || — || November 21, 2001 || Socorro || LINEAR || — || align=right | 3.2 km || 
|-id=238 bgcolor=#d6d6d6
| 111238 ||  || — || November 21, 2001 || Socorro || LINEAR || — || align=right | 5.7 km || 
|-id=239 bgcolor=#E9E9E9
| 111239 ||  || — || November 19, 2001 || Anderson Mesa || LONEOS || HOF || align=right | 5.2 km || 
|-id=240 bgcolor=#E9E9E9
| 111240 ||  || — || November 16, 2001 || Kitt Peak || Spacewatch || — || align=right | 2.7 km || 
|-id=241 bgcolor=#d6d6d6
| 111241 || 2001 XV || — || December 7, 2001 || Bisei SG Center || BATTeRS || — || align=right | 7.6 km || 
|-id=242 bgcolor=#E9E9E9
| 111242 ||  || — || December 8, 2001 || Socorro || LINEAR || BRU || align=right | 5.9 km || 
|-id=243 bgcolor=#fefefe
| 111243 ||  || — || December 8, 2001 || Socorro || LINEAR || H || align=right | 1.2 km || 
|-id=244 bgcolor=#d6d6d6
| 111244 ||  || — || December 8, 2001 || Socorro || LINEAR || EUP || align=right | 7.5 km || 
|-id=245 bgcolor=#FA8072
| 111245 ||  || — || December 9, 2001 || Socorro || LINEAR || — || align=right | 5.0 km || 
|-id=246 bgcolor=#fefefe
| 111246 ||  || — || December 9, 2001 || Socorro || LINEAR || H || align=right | 1.3 km || 
|-id=247 bgcolor=#fefefe
| 111247 ||  || — || December 10, 2001 || Socorro || LINEAR || H || align=right | 1.1 km || 
|-id=248 bgcolor=#E9E9E9
| 111248 ||  || — || December 8, 2001 || Socorro || LINEAR || — || align=right | 6.0 km || 
|-id=249 bgcolor=#d6d6d6
| 111249 ||  || — || December 8, 2001 || Socorro || LINEAR || — || align=right | 6.9 km || 
|-id=250 bgcolor=#E9E9E9
| 111250 ||  || — || December 9, 2001 || Socorro || LINEAR || — || align=right | 5.5 km || 
|-id=251 bgcolor=#E9E9E9
| 111251 ||  || — || December 9, 2001 || Socorro || LINEAR || — || align=right | 2.1 km || 
|-id=252 bgcolor=#E9E9E9
| 111252 ||  || — || December 9, 2001 || Socorro || LINEAR || — || align=right | 3.2 km || 
|-id=253 bgcolor=#FFC2E0
| 111253 ||  || — || December 9, 2001 || Socorro || LINEAR || APO +1kmPHA || align=right | 3.0 km || 
|-id=254 bgcolor=#E9E9E9
| 111254 ||  || — || December 10, 2001 || Socorro || LINEAR || — || align=right | 3.3 km || 
|-id=255 bgcolor=#E9E9E9
| 111255 ||  || — || December 10, 2001 || Socorro || LINEAR || — || align=right | 3.8 km || 
|-id=256 bgcolor=#d6d6d6
| 111256 ||  || — || December 9, 2001 || Socorro || LINEAR || — || align=right | 4.6 km || 
|-id=257 bgcolor=#d6d6d6
| 111257 ||  || — || December 9, 2001 || Socorro || LINEAR || — || align=right | 8.3 km || 
|-id=258 bgcolor=#E9E9E9
| 111258 ||  || — || December 9, 2001 || Socorro || LINEAR || — || align=right | 3.2 km || 
|-id=259 bgcolor=#E9E9E9
| 111259 ||  || — || December 9, 2001 || Socorro || LINEAR || — || align=right | 2.9 km || 
|-id=260 bgcolor=#fefefe
| 111260 ||  || — || December 10, 2001 || Socorro || LINEAR || FLO || align=right | 1.2 km || 
|-id=261 bgcolor=#E9E9E9
| 111261 ||  || — || December 10, 2001 || Socorro || LINEAR || — || align=right | 5.5 km || 
|-id=262 bgcolor=#E9E9E9
| 111262 ||  || — || December 10, 2001 || Socorro || LINEAR || — || align=right | 7.1 km || 
|-id=263 bgcolor=#fefefe
| 111263 ||  || — || December 10, 2001 || Socorro || LINEAR || H || align=right | 1.2 km || 
|-id=264 bgcolor=#E9E9E9
| 111264 ||  || — || December 10, 2001 || Socorro || LINEAR || — || align=right | 2.4 km || 
|-id=265 bgcolor=#E9E9E9
| 111265 ||  || — || December 11, 2001 || Socorro || LINEAR || — || align=right | 3.8 km || 
|-id=266 bgcolor=#E9E9E9
| 111266 ||  || — || December 11, 2001 || Socorro || LINEAR || — || align=right | 3.3 km || 
|-id=267 bgcolor=#d6d6d6
| 111267 ||  || — || December 11, 2001 || Socorro || LINEAR || — || align=right | 8.6 km || 
|-id=268 bgcolor=#E9E9E9
| 111268 ||  || — || December 11, 2001 || Socorro || LINEAR || — || align=right | 4.6 km || 
|-id=269 bgcolor=#d6d6d6
| 111269 ||  || — || December 7, 2001 || Kitt Peak || Spacewatch || — || align=right | 4.0 km || 
|-id=270 bgcolor=#d6d6d6
| 111270 ||  || — || December 7, 2001 || Kitt Peak || Spacewatch || — || align=right | 4.2 km || 
|-id=271 bgcolor=#E9E9E9
| 111271 ||  || — || December 11, 2001 || Kitt Peak || Spacewatch || GEF || align=right | 2.6 km || 
|-id=272 bgcolor=#E9E9E9
| 111272 ||  || — || December 11, 2001 || Kitt Peak || Spacewatch || — || align=right | 2.3 km || 
|-id=273 bgcolor=#d6d6d6
| 111273 ||  || — || December 9, 2001 || Socorro || LINEAR || 629 || align=right | 2.6 km || 
|-id=274 bgcolor=#E9E9E9
| 111274 ||  || — || December 13, 2001 || Palomar || NEAT || — || align=right | 4.7 km || 
|-id=275 bgcolor=#d6d6d6
| 111275 ||  || — || December 9, 2001 || Socorro || LINEAR || EOS || align=right | 3.8 km || 
|-id=276 bgcolor=#d6d6d6
| 111276 ||  || — || December 9, 2001 || Socorro || LINEAR || LUT || align=right | 9.5 km || 
|-id=277 bgcolor=#d6d6d6
| 111277 ||  || — || December 9, 2001 || Socorro || LINEAR || EOS || align=right | 3.7 km || 
|-id=278 bgcolor=#E9E9E9
| 111278 ||  || — || December 9, 2001 || Socorro || LINEAR || — || align=right | 4.6 km || 
|-id=279 bgcolor=#d6d6d6
| 111279 ||  || — || December 9, 2001 || Socorro || LINEAR || — || align=right | 6.8 km || 
|-id=280 bgcolor=#E9E9E9
| 111280 ||  || — || December 9, 2001 || Socorro || LINEAR || GEF || align=right | 2.2 km || 
|-id=281 bgcolor=#E9E9E9
| 111281 ||  || — || December 9, 2001 || Socorro || LINEAR || — || align=right | 5.1 km || 
|-id=282 bgcolor=#E9E9E9
| 111282 ||  || — || December 9, 2001 || Socorro || LINEAR || — || align=right | 3.7 km || 
|-id=283 bgcolor=#d6d6d6
| 111283 ||  || — || December 9, 2001 || Socorro || LINEAR || LIX || align=right | 8.4 km || 
|-id=284 bgcolor=#fefefe
| 111284 ||  || — || December 9, 2001 || Socorro || LINEAR || H || align=right | 1.2 km || 
|-id=285 bgcolor=#E9E9E9
| 111285 ||  || — || December 9, 2001 || Socorro || LINEAR || — || align=right | 2.4 km || 
|-id=286 bgcolor=#d6d6d6
| 111286 ||  || — || December 9, 2001 || Socorro || LINEAR || — || align=right | 4.3 km || 
|-id=287 bgcolor=#d6d6d6
| 111287 ||  || — || December 9, 2001 || Socorro || LINEAR || — || align=right | 5.6 km || 
|-id=288 bgcolor=#E9E9E9
| 111288 ||  || — || December 10, 2001 || Socorro || LINEAR || EUN || align=right | 3.4 km || 
|-id=289 bgcolor=#d6d6d6
| 111289 ||  || — || December 13, 2001 || Socorro || LINEAR || — || align=right | 6.2 km || 
|-id=290 bgcolor=#E9E9E9
| 111290 ||  || — || December 10, 2001 || Socorro || LINEAR || — || align=right | 5.5 km || 
|-id=291 bgcolor=#d6d6d6
| 111291 ||  || — || December 10, 2001 || Socorro || LINEAR || BRA || align=right | 5.1 km || 
|-id=292 bgcolor=#d6d6d6
| 111292 ||  || — || December 10, 2001 || Socorro || LINEAR || EOS || align=right | 3.9 km || 
|-id=293 bgcolor=#d6d6d6
| 111293 ||  || — || December 10, 2001 || Socorro || LINEAR || KOR || align=right | 3.0 km || 
|-id=294 bgcolor=#E9E9E9
| 111294 ||  || — || December 10, 2001 || Socorro || LINEAR || AEO || align=right | 2.8 km || 
|-id=295 bgcolor=#fefefe
| 111295 ||  || — || December 10, 2001 || Socorro || LINEAR || MAS || align=right | 2.2 km || 
|-id=296 bgcolor=#d6d6d6
| 111296 ||  || — || December 10, 2001 || Socorro || LINEAR || — || align=right | 4.1 km || 
|-id=297 bgcolor=#d6d6d6
| 111297 ||  || — || December 10, 2001 || Socorro || LINEAR || EUP || align=right | 10 km || 
|-id=298 bgcolor=#fefefe
| 111298 ||  || — || December 10, 2001 || Socorro || LINEAR || NYS || align=right | 1.4 km || 
|-id=299 bgcolor=#E9E9E9
| 111299 ||  || — || December 10, 2001 || Socorro || LINEAR || — || align=right | 3.7 km || 
|-id=300 bgcolor=#E9E9E9
| 111300 ||  || — || December 11, 2001 || Socorro || LINEAR || — || align=right | 3.3 km || 
|}

111301–111400 

|-bgcolor=#E9E9E9
| 111301 ||  || — || December 11, 2001 || Socorro || LINEAR || — || align=right | 4.3 km || 
|-id=302 bgcolor=#d6d6d6
| 111302 ||  || — || December 10, 2001 || Socorro || LINEAR || THM || align=right | 4.8 km || 
|-id=303 bgcolor=#d6d6d6
| 111303 ||  || — || December 10, 2001 || Socorro || LINEAR || 628 || align=right | 5.3 km || 
|-id=304 bgcolor=#d6d6d6
| 111304 ||  || — || December 10, 2001 || Socorro || LINEAR || — || align=right | 6.1 km || 
|-id=305 bgcolor=#d6d6d6
| 111305 ||  || — || December 10, 2001 || Socorro || LINEAR || LIX || align=right | 7.6 km || 
|-id=306 bgcolor=#E9E9E9
| 111306 ||  || — || December 10, 2001 || Socorro || LINEAR || — || align=right | 3.2 km || 
|-id=307 bgcolor=#d6d6d6
| 111307 ||  || — || December 10, 2001 || Socorro || LINEAR || — || align=right | 6.0 km || 
|-id=308 bgcolor=#d6d6d6
| 111308 ||  || — || December 10, 2001 || Socorro || LINEAR || — || align=right | 8.0 km || 
|-id=309 bgcolor=#d6d6d6
| 111309 ||  || — || December 11, 2001 || Socorro || LINEAR || — || align=right | 5.5 km || 
|-id=310 bgcolor=#E9E9E9
| 111310 ||  || — || December 10, 2001 || Socorro || LINEAR || — || align=right | 5.9 km || 
|-id=311 bgcolor=#E9E9E9
| 111311 ||  || — || December 10, 2001 || Socorro || LINEAR || — || align=right | 3.1 km || 
|-id=312 bgcolor=#E9E9E9
| 111312 ||  || — || December 11, 2001 || Socorro || LINEAR || — || align=right | 3.4 km || 
|-id=313 bgcolor=#E9E9E9
| 111313 ||  || — || December 11, 2001 || Socorro || LINEAR || WIT || align=right | 1.9 km || 
|-id=314 bgcolor=#E9E9E9
| 111314 ||  || — || December 11, 2001 || Socorro || LINEAR || — || align=right | 4.5 km || 
|-id=315 bgcolor=#d6d6d6
| 111315 ||  || — || December 11, 2001 || Socorro || LINEAR || — || align=right | 6.0 km || 
|-id=316 bgcolor=#d6d6d6
| 111316 ||  || — || December 11, 2001 || Socorro || LINEAR || — || align=right | 4.9 km || 
|-id=317 bgcolor=#E9E9E9
| 111317 ||  || — || December 11, 2001 || Socorro || LINEAR || HEN || align=right | 2.4 km || 
|-id=318 bgcolor=#E9E9E9
| 111318 ||  || — || December 11, 2001 || Socorro || LINEAR || — || align=right | 2.8 km || 
|-id=319 bgcolor=#E9E9E9
| 111319 ||  || — || December 11, 2001 || Socorro || LINEAR || — || align=right | 4.5 km || 
|-id=320 bgcolor=#E9E9E9
| 111320 ||  || — || December 11, 2001 || Socorro || LINEAR || — || align=right | 2.5 km || 
|-id=321 bgcolor=#d6d6d6
| 111321 ||  || — || December 11, 2001 || Socorro || LINEAR || KOR || align=right | 2.3 km || 
|-id=322 bgcolor=#E9E9E9
| 111322 ||  || — || December 11, 2001 || Socorro || LINEAR || — || align=right | 3.5 km || 
|-id=323 bgcolor=#E9E9E9
| 111323 ||  || — || December 11, 2001 || Socorro || LINEAR || HOF || align=right | 4.2 km || 
|-id=324 bgcolor=#E9E9E9
| 111324 ||  || — || December 11, 2001 || Socorro || LINEAR || — || align=right | 4.9 km || 
|-id=325 bgcolor=#fefefe
| 111325 ||  || — || December 11, 2001 || Socorro || LINEAR || FLO || align=right | 1.2 km || 
|-id=326 bgcolor=#E9E9E9
| 111326 ||  || — || December 11, 2001 || Socorro || LINEAR || — || align=right | 4.0 km || 
|-id=327 bgcolor=#d6d6d6
| 111327 ||  || — || December 11, 2001 || Socorro || LINEAR || — || align=right | 3.9 km || 
|-id=328 bgcolor=#E9E9E9
| 111328 ||  || — || December 11, 2001 || Socorro || LINEAR || — || align=right | 1.9 km || 
|-id=329 bgcolor=#d6d6d6
| 111329 ||  || — || December 14, 2001 || Desert Eagle || W. K. Y. Yeung || CRO || align=right | 7.8 km || 
|-id=330 bgcolor=#E9E9E9
| 111330 ||  || — || December 14, 2001 || Desert Eagle || W. K. Y. Yeung || — || align=right | 3.8 km || 
|-id=331 bgcolor=#d6d6d6
| 111331 ||  || — || December 9, 2001 || Socorro || LINEAR || 628 || align=right | 4.2 km || 
|-id=332 bgcolor=#E9E9E9
| 111332 ||  || — || December 10, 2001 || Socorro || LINEAR || — || align=right | 5.7 km || 
|-id=333 bgcolor=#E9E9E9
| 111333 ||  || — || December 10, 2001 || Socorro || LINEAR || HOF || align=right | 4.8 km || 
|-id=334 bgcolor=#E9E9E9
| 111334 ||  || — || December 10, 2001 || Socorro || LINEAR || PAD || align=right | 3.4 km || 
|-id=335 bgcolor=#d6d6d6
| 111335 ||  || — || December 10, 2001 || Socorro || LINEAR || KAR || align=right | 2.0 km || 
|-id=336 bgcolor=#fefefe
| 111336 ||  || — || December 10, 2001 || Socorro || LINEAR || — || align=right | 1.5 km || 
|-id=337 bgcolor=#E9E9E9
| 111337 ||  || — || December 10, 2001 || Socorro || LINEAR || — || align=right | 3.2 km || 
|-id=338 bgcolor=#E9E9E9
| 111338 ||  || — || December 10, 2001 || Socorro || LINEAR || — || align=right | 3.5 km || 
|-id=339 bgcolor=#E9E9E9
| 111339 ||  || — || December 10, 2001 || Socorro || LINEAR || — || align=right | 3.7 km || 
|-id=340 bgcolor=#E9E9E9
| 111340 ||  || — || December 10, 2001 || Socorro || LINEAR || GEF || align=right | 3.2 km || 
|-id=341 bgcolor=#E9E9E9
| 111341 ||  || — || December 10, 2001 || Socorro || LINEAR || — || align=right | 3.4 km || 
|-id=342 bgcolor=#d6d6d6
| 111342 ||  || — || December 10, 2001 || Socorro || LINEAR || — || align=right | 6.0 km || 
|-id=343 bgcolor=#d6d6d6
| 111343 ||  || — || December 10, 2001 || Socorro || LINEAR || — || align=right | 5.4 km || 
|-id=344 bgcolor=#E9E9E9
| 111344 ||  || — || December 10, 2001 || Socorro || LINEAR || HNA || align=right | 4.3 km || 
|-id=345 bgcolor=#E9E9E9
| 111345 ||  || — || December 11, 2001 || Socorro || LINEAR || — || align=right | 2.6 km || 
|-id=346 bgcolor=#FA8072
| 111346 ||  || — || December 14, 2001 || Socorro || LINEAR || slow? || align=right | 1.4 km || 
|-id=347 bgcolor=#fefefe
| 111347 ||  || — || December 7, 2001 || Socorro || LINEAR || H || align=right | 1.3 km || 
|-id=348 bgcolor=#E9E9E9
| 111348 ||  || — || December 10, 2001 || Socorro || LINEAR || PAD || align=right | 3.7 km || 
|-id=349 bgcolor=#E9E9E9
| 111349 ||  || — || December 10, 2001 || Socorro || LINEAR || — || align=right | 2.4 km || 
|-id=350 bgcolor=#E9E9E9
| 111350 ||  || — || December 10, 2001 || Socorro || LINEAR || AGN || align=right | 2.8 km || 
|-id=351 bgcolor=#d6d6d6
| 111351 ||  || — || December 10, 2001 || Socorro || LINEAR || ALA || align=right | 7.5 km || 
|-id=352 bgcolor=#d6d6d6
| 111352 ||  || — || December 10, 2001 || Socorro || LINEAR || — || align=right | 7.3 km || 
|-id=353 bgcolor=#fefefe
| 111353 ||  || — || December 10, 2001 || Socorro || LINEAR || FLO || align=right | 1.5 km || 
|-id=354 bgcolor=#E9E9E9
| 111354 ||  || — || December 11, 2001 || Socorro || LINEAR || PAD || align=right | 3.0 km || 
|-id=355 bgcolor=#d6d6d6
| 111355 ||  || — || December 11, 2001 || Socorro || LINEAR || — || align=right | 6.0 km || 
|-id=356 bgcolor=#E9E9E9
| 111356 ||  || — || December 11, 2001 || Socorro || LINEAR || — || align=right | 5.0 km || 
|-id=357 bgcolor=#E9E9E9
| 111357 ||  || — || December 11, 2001 || Socorro || LINEAR || — || align=right | 5.1 km || 
|-id=358 bgcolor=#E9E9E9
| 111358 ||  || — || December 13, 2001 || Socorro || LINEAR || — || align=right | 3.5 km || 
|-id=359 bgcolor=#d6d6d6
| 111359 ||  || — || December 13, 2001 || Socorro || LINEAR || — || align=right | 11 km || 
|-id=360 bgcolor=#E9E9E9
| 111360 ||  || — || December 14, 2001 || Socorro || LINEAR || HEN || align=right | 1.8 km || 
|-id=361 bgcolor=#d6d6d6
| 111361 ||  || — || December 14, 2001 || Socorro || LINEAR || — || align=right | 3.9 km || 
|-id=362 bgcolor=#E9E9E9
| 111362 ||  || — || December 14, 2001 || Socorro || LINEAR || — || align=right | 3.6 km || 
|-id=363 bgcolor=#d6d6d6
| 111363 ||  || — || December 14, 2001 || Socorro || LINEAR || — || align=right | 4.0 km || 
|-id=364 bgcolor=#d6d6d6
| 111364 ||  || — || December 14, 2001 || Socorro || LINEAR || KOR || align=right | 3.0 km || 
|-id=365 bgcolor=#E9E9E9
| 111365 ||  || — || December 14, 2001 || Socorro || LINEAR || — || align=right | 3.0 km || 
|-id=366 bgcolor=#E9E9E9
| 111366 ||  || — || December 14, 2001 || Socorro || LINEAR || — || align=right | 2.6 km || 
|-id=367 bgcolor=#d6d6d6
| 111367 ||  || — || December 14, 2001 || Socorro || LINEAR || KOR || align=right | 3.1 km || 
|-id=368 bgcolor=#fefefe
| 111368 ||  || — || December 14, 2001 || Socorro || LINEAR || — || align=right | 2.9 km || 
|-id=369 bgcolor=#d6d6d6
| 111369 ||  || — || December 14, 2001 || Socorro || LINEAR || — || align=right | 5.9 km || 
|-id=370 bgcolor=#d6d6d6
| 111370 ||  || — || December 14, 2001 || Socorro || LINEAR || — || align=right | 4.4 km || 
|-id=371 bgcolor=#d6d6d6
| 111371 ||  || — || December 14, 2001 || Socorro || LINEAR || — || align=right | 7.8 km || 
|-id=372 bgcolor=#E9E9E9
| 111372 ||  || — || December 14, 2001 || Socorro || LINEAR || NEM || align=right | 4.7 km || 
|-id=373 bgcolor=#d6d6d6
| 111373 ||  || — || December 14, 2001 || Socorro || LINEAR || — || align=right | 5.1 km || 
|-id=374 bgcolor=#E9E9E9
| 111374 ||  || — || December 14, 2001 || Socorro || LINEAR || AST || align=right | 4.9 km || 
|-id=375 bgcolor=#d6d6d6
| 111375 ||  || — || December 14, 2001 || Socorro || LINEAR || KOR || align=right | 2.6 km || 
|-id=376 bgcolor=#d6d6d6
| 111376 ||  || — || December 14, 2001 || Socorro || LINEAR || — || align=right | 7.2 km || 
|-id=377 bgcolor=#d6d6d6
| 111377 ||  || — || December 14, 2001 || Socorro || LINEAR || — || align=right | 3.1 km || 
|-id=378 bgcolor=#d6d6d6
| 111378 ||  || — || December 14, 2001 || Socorro || LINEAR || — || align=right | 7.0 km || 
|-id=379 bgcolor=#d6d6d6
| 111379 ||  || — || December 14, 2001 || Socorro || LINEAR || KOR || align=right | 2.8 km || 
|-id=380 bgcolor=#E9E9E9
| 111380 ||  || — || December 14, 2001 || Socorro || LINEAR || — || align=right | 3.1 km || 
|-id=381 bgcolor=#d6d6d6
| 111381 ||  || — || December 14, 2001 || Socorro || LINEAR || — || align=right | 4.1 km || 
|-id=382 bgcolor=#E9E9E9
| 111382 ||  || — || December 14, 2001 || Socorro || LINEAR || — || align=right | 3.8 km || 
|-id=383 bgcolor=#d6d6d6
| 111383 ||  || — || December 14, 2001 || Socorro || LINEAR || KOR || align=right | 2.8 km || 
|-id=384 bgcolor=#E9E9E9
| 111384 ||  || — || December 14, 2001 || Socorro || LINEAR || — || align=right | 5.7 km || 
|-id=385 bgcolor=#E9E9E9
| 111385 ||  || — || December 14, 2001 || Socorro || LINEAR || AGN || align=right | 2.6 km || 
|-id=386 bgcolor=#d6d6d6
| 111386 ||  || — || December 14, 2001 || Socorro || LINEAR || EOS || align=right | 2.9 km || 
|-id=387 bgcolor=#fefefe
| 111387 ||  || — || December 14, 2001 || Socorro || LINEAR || — || align=right | 1.9 km || 
|-id=388 bgcolor=#d6d6d6
| 111388 ||  || — || December 14, 2001 || Socorro || LINEAR || — || align=right | 4.5 km || 
|-id=389 bgcolor=#d6d6d6
| 111389 ||  || — || December 14, 2001 || Socorro || LINEAR || KOR || align=right | 2.0 km || 
|-id=390 bgcolor=#fefefe
| 111390 ||  || — || December 14, 2001 || Socorro || LINEAR || MAS || align=right | 1.4 km || 
|-id=391 bgcolor=#d6d6d6
| 111391 ||  || — || December 14, 2001 || Socorro || LINEAR || CHA || align=right | 2.6 km || 
|-id=392 bgcolor=#E9E9E9
| 111392 ||  || — || December 14, 2001 || Socorro || LINEAR || HOF || align=right | 4.8 km || 
|-id=393 bgcolor=#d6d6d6
| 111393 ||  || — || December 14, 2001 || Socorro || LINEAR || — || align=right | 5.5 km || 
|-id=394 bgcolor=#d6d6d6
| 111394 ||  || — || December 14, 2001 || Socorro || LINEAR || — || align=right | 5.7 km || 
|-id=395 bgcolor=#d6d6d6
| 111395 ||  || — || December 14, 2001 || Socorro || LINEAR || — || align=right | 5.1 km || 
|-id=396 bgcolor=#E9E9E9
| 111396 ||  || — || December 14, 2001 || Socorro || LINEAR || WAT || align=right | 4.8 km || 
|-id=397 bgcolor=#d6d6d6
| 111397 ||  || — || December 14, 2001 || Socorro || LINEAR || EOS || align=right | 3.4 km || 
|-id=398 bgcolor=#d6d6d6
| 111398 ||  || — || December 14, 2001 || Socorro || LINEAR || — || align=right | 3.5 km || 
|-id=399 bgcolor=#d6d6d6
| 111399 ||  || — || December 14, 2001 || Socorro || LINEAR || — || align=right | 6.0 km || 
|-id=400 bgcolor=#d6d6d6
| 111400 ||  || — || December 14, 2001 || Socorro || LINEAR || THM || align=right | 5.1 km || 
|}

111401–111500 

|-bgcolor=#d6d6d6
| 111401 ||  || — || December 14, 2001 || Socorro || LINEAR || TEL || align=right | 3.1 km || 
|-id=402 bgcolor=#fefefe
| 111402 ||  || — || December 14, 2001 || Socorro || LINEAR || NYS || align=right | 1.3 km || 
|-id=403 bgcolor=#d6d6d6
| 111403 ||  || — || December 14, 2001 || Socorro || LINEAR || — || align=right | 5.7 km || 
|-id=404 bgcolor=#d6d6d6
| 111404 ||  || — || December 14, 2001 || Socorro || LINEAR || — || align=right | 3.8 km || 
|-id=405 bgcolor=#d6d6d6
| 111405 ||  || — || December 14, 2001 || Socorro || LINEAR || THM || align=right | 4.2 km || 
|-id=406 bgcolor=#d6d6d6
| 111406 ||  || — || December 14, 2001 || Socorro || LINEAR || HYG || align=right | 6.0 km || 
|-id=407 bgcolor=#d6d6d6
| 111407 ||  || — || December 14, 2001 || Socorro || LINEAR || — || align=right | 5.5 km || 
|-id=408 bgcolor=#E9E9E9
| 111408 ||  || — || December 14, 2001 || Socorro || LINEAR || NEM || align=right | 4.9 km || 
|-id=409 bgcolor=#d6d6d6
| 111409 ||  || — || December 14, 2001 || Socorro || LINEAR || EOS || align=right | 3.9 km || 
|-id=410 bgcolor=#fefefe
| 111410 ||  || — || December 14, 2001 || Socorro || LINEAR || — || align=right | 1.4 km || 
|-id=411 bgcolor=#d6d6d6
| 111411 ||  || — || December 14, 2001 || Socorro || LINEAR || — || align=right | 3.4 km || 
|-id=412 bgcolor=#d6d6d6
| 111412 ||  || — || December 14, 2001 || Socorro || LINEAR || CHA || align=right | 4.1 km || 
|-id=413 bgcolor=#E9E9E9
| 111413 ||  || — || December 14, 2001 || Socorro || LINEAR || — || align=right | 4.1 km || 
|-id=414 bgcolor=#d6d6d6
| 111414 ||  || — || December 14, 2001 || Socorro || LINEAR || — || align=right | 4.7 km || 
|-id=415 bgcolor=#d6d6d6
| 111415 ||  || — || December 14, 2001 || Socorro || LINEAR || — || align=right | 3.6 km || 
|-id=416 bgcolor=#d6d6d6
| 111416 ||  || — || December 14, 2001 || Socorro || LINEAR || — || align=right | 3.8 km || 
|-id=417 bgcolor=#d6d6d6
| 111417 ||  || — || December 14, 2001 || Socorro || LINEAR || — || align=right | 6.0 km || 
|-id=418 bgcolor=#E9E9E9
| 111418 ||  || — || December 14, 2001 || Socorro || LINEAR || — || align=right | 3.1 km || 
|-id=419 bgcolor=#E9E9E9
| 111419 ||  || — || December 14, 2001 || Socorro || LINEAR || — || align=right | 4.0 km || 
|-id=420 bgcolor=#fefefe
| 111420 ||  || — || December 14, 2001 || Socorro || LINEAR || FLO || align=right | 1.3 km || 
|-id=421 bgcolor=#d6d6d6
| 111421 ||  || — || December 14, 2001 || Socorro || LINEAR || THM || align=right | 5.9 km || 
|-id=422 bgcolor=#d6d6d6
| 111422 ||  || — || December 14, 2001 || Socorro || LINEAR || — || align=right | 7.7 km || 
|-id=423 bgcolor=#fefefe
| 111423 ||  || — || December 14, 2001 || Socorro || LINEAR || FLO || align=right | 1.3 km || 
|-id=424 bgcolor=#fefefe
| 111424 ||  || — || December 14, 2001 || Socorro || LINEAR || — || align=right | 1.7 km || 
|-id=425 bgcolor=#E9E9E9
| 111425 ||  || — || December 11, 2001 || Socorro || LINEAR || — || align=right | 4.2 km || 
|-id=426 bgcolor=#d6d6d6
| 111426 ||  || — || December 11, 2001 || Socorro || LINEAR || — || align=right | 5.7 km || 
|-id=427 bgcolor=#E9E9E9
| 111427 ||  || — || December 11, 2001 || Socorro || LINEAR || — || align=right | 4.5 km || 
|-id=428 bgcolor=#fefefe
| 111428 ||  || — || December 11, 2001 || Socorro || LINEAR || — || align=right | 1.7 km || 
|-id=429 bgcolor=#E9E9E9
| 111429 ||  || — || December 11, 2001 || Socorro || LINEAR || — || align=right | 5.1 km || 
|-id=430 bgcolor=#E9E9E9
| 111430 ||  || — || December 11, 2001 || Socorro || LINEAR || — || align=right | 4.2 km || 
|-id=431 bgcolor=#d6d6d6
| 111431 ||  || — || December 11, 2001 || Socorro || LINEAR || EOS || align=right | 4.2 km || 
|-id=432 bgcolor=#d6d6d6
| 111432 ||  || — || December 11, 2001 || Socorro || LINEAR || EOS || align=right | 3.8 km || 
|-id=433 bgcolor=#E9E9E9
| 111433 ||  || — || December 11, 2001 || Socorro || LINEAR || — || align=right | 5.6 km || 
|-id=434 bgcolor=#d6d6d6
| 111434 ||  || — || December 14, 2001 || Socorro || LINEAR || — || align=right | 5.3 km || 
|-id=435 bgcolor=#E9E9E9
| 111435 ||  || — || December 15, 2001 || Socorro || LINEAR || GEF || align=right | 3.5 km || 
|-id=436 bgcolor=#d6d6d6
| 111436 ||  || — || December 15, 2001 || Socorro || LINEAR || KAR || align=right | 2.3 km || 
|-id=437 bgcolor=#E9E9E9
| 111437 ||  || — || December 15, 2001 || Socorro || LINEAR || — || align=right | 3.9 km || 
|-id=438 bgcolor=#d6d6d6
| 111438 ||  || — || December 15, 2001 || Socorro || LINEAR || — || align=right | 4.4 km || 
|-id=439 bgcolor=#E9E9E9
| 111439 ||  || — || December 15, 2001 || Socorro || LINEAR || — || align=right | 3.5 km || 
|-id=440 bgcolor=#d6d6d6
| 111440 ||  || — || December 15, 2001 || Socorro || LINEAR || — || align=right | 4.7 km || 
|-id=441 bgcolor=#d6d6d6
| 111441 ||  || — || December 15, 2001 || Socorro || LINEAR || — || align=right | 4.7 km || 
|-id=442 bgcolor=#E9E9E9
| 111442 ||  || — || December 15, 2001 || Socorro || LINEAR || — || align=right | 5.5 km || 
|-id=443 bgcolor=#E9E9E9
| 111443 ||  || — || December 15, 2001 || Socorro || LINEAR || — || align=right | 3.3 km || 
|-id=444 bgcolor=#d6d6d6
| 111444 ||  || — || December 15, 2001 || Socorro || LINEAR || — || align=right | 5.5 km || 
|-id=445 bgcolor=#d6d6d6
| 111445 ||  || — || December 15, 2001 || Socorro || LINEAR || — || align=right | 5.2 km || 
|-id=446 bgcolor=#E9E9E9
| 111446 ||  || — || December 15, 2001 || Socorro || LINEAR || — || align=right | 4.6 km || 
|-id=447 bgcolor=#d6d6d6
| 111447 ||  || — || December 15, 2001 || Socorro || LINEAR || KOR || align=right | 2.8 km || 
|-id=448 bgcolor=#d6d6d6
| 111448 ||  || — || December 15, 2001 || Socorro || LINEAR || EOS || align=right | 4.3 km || 
|-id=449 bgcolor=#d6d6d6
| 111449 ||  || — || December 15, 2001 || Socorro || LINEAR || — || align=right | 6.4 km || 
|-id=450 bgcolor=#E9E9E9
| 111450 ||  || — || December 15, 2001 || Socorro || LINEAR || — || align=right | 2.2 km || 
|-id=451 bgcolor=#E9E9E9
| 111451 ||  || — || December 15, 2001 || Socorro || LINEAR || — || align=right | 5.2 km || 
|-id=452 bgcolor=#E9E9E9
| 111452 ||  || — || December 15, 2001 || Socorro || LINEAR || — || align=right | 3.9 km || 
|-id=453 bgcolor=#E9E9E9
| 111453 ||  || — || December 14, 2001 || Palomar || NEAT || AGN || align=right | 2.2 km || 
|-id=454 bgcolor=#E9E9E9
| 111454 ||  || — || December 14, 2001 || Socorro || LINEAR || — || align=right | 3.8 km || 
|-id=455 bgcolor=#d6d6d6
| 111455 ||  || — || December 14, 2001 || Socorro || LINEAR || — || align=right | 5.5 km || 
|-id=456 bgcolor=#E9E9E9
| 111456 ||  || — || December 15, 2001 || Socorro || LINEAR || — || align=right | 4.5 km || 
|-id=457 bgcolor=#E9E9E9
| 111457 ||  || — || December 7, 2001 || Socorro || LINEAR || — || align=right | 2.4 km || 
|-id=458 bgcolor=#E9E9E9
| 111458 ||  || — || December 7, 2001 || Socorro || LINEAR || GEF || align=right | 2.3 km || 
|-id=459 bgcolor=#E9E9E9
| 111459 ||  || — || December 7, 2001 || Socorro || LINEAR || — || align=right | 4.5 km || 
|-id=460 bgcolor=#E9E9E9
| 111460 ||  || — || December 8, 2001 || Anderson Mesa || LONEOS || — || align=right | 2.9 km || 
|-id=461 bgcolor=#d6d6d6
| 111461 ||  || — || December 8, 2001 || Socorro || LINEAR || SYL7:4 || align=right | 7.2 km || 
|-id=462 bgcolor=#E9E9E9
| 111462 ||  || — || December 9, 2001 || Anderson Mesa || LONEOS || HOF || align=right | 4.9 km || 
|-id=463 bgcolor=#E9E9E9
| 111463 ||  || — || December 9, 2001 || Palomar || NEAT || MRX || align=right | 2.2 km || 
|-id=464 bgcolor=#d6d6d6
| 111464 ||  || — || December 12, 2001 || Palomar || NEAT || KOR || align=right | 2.9 km || 
|-id=465 bgcolor=#E9E9E9
| 111465 ||  || — || December 14, 2001 || Anderson Mesa || LONEOS || GEF || align=right | 3.0 km || 
|-id=466 bgcolor=#E9E9E9
| 111466 ||  || — || December 18, 2001 || Needville || Needville Obs. || — || align=right | 2.2 km || 
|-id=467 bgcolor=#E9E9E9
| 111467 ||  || — || December 19, 2001 || Fountain Hills || C. W. Juels, P. R. Holvorcem || MAR || align=right | 3.5 km || 
|-id=468 bgcolor=#d6d6d6
| 111468 Alba Regia ||  ||  || December 23, 2001 || Piszkéstető || K. Sárneczky, G. Fűrész || — || align=right | 5.4 km || 
|-id=469 bgcolor=#E9E9E9
| 111469 ||  || — || December 17, 2001 || Socorro || LINEAR || PAD || align=right | 4.7 km || 
|-id=470 bgcolor=#d6d6d6
| 111470 ||  || — || December 17, 2001 || Socorro || LINEAR || — || align=right | 6.7 km || 
|-id=471 bgcolor=#d6d6d6
| 111471 ||  || — || December 17, 2001 || Socorro || LINEAR || — || align=right | 3.9 km || 
|-id=472 bgcolor=#d6d6d6
| 111472 ||  || — || December 17, 2001 || Socorro || LINEAR || — || align=right | 6.1 km || 
|-id=473 bgcolor=#fefefe
| 111473 ||  || — || December 17, 2001 || Socorro || LINEAR || FLO || align=right | 1.6 km || 
|-id=474 bgcolor=#d6d6d6
| 111474 ||  || — || December 17, 2001 || Socorro || LINEAR || — || align=right | 4.5 km || 
|-id=475 bgcolor=#d6d6d6
| 111475 ||  || — || December 17, 2001 || Socorro || LINEAR || — || align=right | 4.3 km || 
|-id=476 bgcolor=#d6d6d6
| 111476 ||  || — || December 17, 2001 || Socorro || LINEAR || — || align=right | 4.8 km || 
|-id=477 bgcolor=#fefefe
| 111477 ||  || — || December 17, 2001 || Socorro || LINEAR || FLO || align=right | 1.9 km || 
|-id=478 bgcolor=#d6d6d6
| 111478 ||  || — || December 17, 2001 || Socorro || LINEAR || KOR || align=right | 2.9 km || 
|-id=479 bgcolor=#d6d6d6
| 111479 ||  || — || December 18, 2001 || Socorro || LINEAR || KOR || align=right | 2.7 km || 
|-id=480 bgcolor=#d6d6d6
| 111480 ||  || — || December 18, 2001 || Socorro || LINEAR || KOR || align=right | 3.9 km || 
|-id=481 bgcolor=#E9E9E9
| 111481 ||  || — || December 18, 2001 || Socorro || LINEAR || AGN || align=right | 2.1 km || 
|-id=482 bgcolor=#E9E9E9
| 111482 ||  || — || December 18, 2001 || Socorro || LINEAR || HNA || align=right | 4.7 km || 
|-id=483 bgcolor=#fefefe
| 111483 ||  || — || December 18, 2001 || Socorro || LINEAR || FLO || align=right | 1.6 km || 
|-id=484 bgcolor=#d6d6d6
| 111484 ||  || — || December 18, 2001 || Socorro || LINEAR || — || align=right | 5.6 km || 
|-id=485 bgcolor=#d6d6d6
| 111485 ||  || — || December 18, 2001 || Socorro || LINEAR || — || align=right | 4.3 km || 
|-id=486 bgcolor=#E9E9E9
| 111486 ||  || — || December 18, 2001 || Socorro || LINEAR || NEM || align=right | 4.9 km || 
|-id=487 bgcolor=#fefefe
| 111487 ||  || — || December 18, 2001 || Socorro || LINEAR || NYS || align=right | 1.2 km || 
|-id=488 bgcolor=#d6d6d6
| 111488 ||  || — || December 18, 2001 || Socorro || LINEAR || EOS || align=right | 4.0 km || 
|-id=489 bgcolor=#d6d6d6
| 111489 ||  || — || December 18, 2001 || Socorro || LINEAR || KOR || align=right | 2.6 km || 
|-id=490 bgcolor=#d6d6d6
| 111490 ||  || — || December 18, 2001 || Socorro || LINEAR || — || align=right | 4.5 km || 
|-id=491 bgcolor=#E9E9E9
| 111491 ||  || — || December 18, 2001 || Socorro || LINEAR || — || align=right | 4.1 km || 
|-id=492 bgcolor=#E9E9E9
| 111492 ||  || — || December 18, 2001 || Socorro || LINEAR || WIT || align=right | 1.9 km || 
|-id=493 bgcolor=#E9E9E9
| 111493 ||  || — || December 18, 2001 || Socorro || LINEAR || — || align=right | 3.4 km || 
|-id=494 bgcolor=#E9E9E9
| 111494 ||  || — || December 18, 2001 || Socorro || LINEAR || — || align=right | 2.9 km || 
|-id=495 bgcolor=#d6d6d6
| 111495 ||  || — || December 18, 2001 || Socorro || LINEAR || EOS || align=right | 3.5 km || 
|-id=496 bgcolor=#d6d6d6
| 111496 ||  || — || December 18, 2001 || Socorro || LINEAR || — || align=right | 7.2 km || 
|-id=497 bgcolor=#d6d6d6
| 111497 ||  || — || December 18, 2001 || Socorro || LINEAR || KOR || align=right | 3.1 km || 
|-id=498 bgcolor=#d6d6d6
| 111498 ||  || — || December 18, 2001 || Socorro || LINEAR || — || align=right | 4.1 km || 
|-id=499 bgcolor=#d6d6d6
| 111499 ||  || — || December 18, 2001 || Socorro || LINEAR || — || align=right | 6.6 km || 
|-id=500 bgcolor=#E9E9E9
| 111500 ||  || — || December 18, 2001 || Socorro || LINEAR || — || align=right | 3.2 km || 
|}

111501–111600 

|-bgcolor=#d6d6d6
| 111501 ||  || — || December 18, 2001 || Socorro || LINEAR || THM || align=right | 7.5 km || 
|-id=502 bgcolor=#d6d6d6
| 111502 ||  || — || December 18, 2001 || Socorro || LINEAR || — || align=right | 5.8 km || 
|-id=503 bgcolor=#d6d6d6
| 111503 ||  || — || December 18, 2001 || Socorro || LINEAR || — || align=right | 8.1 km || 
|-id=504 bgcolor=#d6d6d6
| 111504 ||  || — || December 18, 2001 || Socorro || LINEAR || — || align=right | 7.8 km || 
|-id=505 bgcolor=#d6d6d6
| 111505 ||  || — || December 18, 2001 || Socorro || LINEAR || — || align=right | 3.2 km || 
|-id=506 bgcolor=#d6d6d6
| 111506 ||  || — || December 18, 2001 || Socorro || LINEAR || — || align=right | 4.0 km || 
|-id=507 bgcolor=#d6d6d6
| 111507 ||  || — || December 18, 2001 || Socorro || LINEAR || — || align=right | 5.4 km || 
|-id=508 bgcolor=#d6d6d6
| 111508 ||  || — || December 18, 2001 || Socorro || LINEAR || — || align=right | 3.9 km || 
|-id=509 bgcolor=#d6d6d6
| 111509 ||  || — || December 18, 2001 || Socorro || LINEAR || — || align=right | 5.7 km || 
|-id=510 bgcolor=#d6d6d6
| 111510 ||  || — || December 18, 2001 || Socorro || LINEAR || — || align=right | 5.9 km || 
|-id=511 bgcolor=#d6d6d6
| 111511 ||  || — || December 18, 2001 || Socorro || LINEAR || THM || align=right | 5.0 km || 
|-id=512 bgcolor=#d6d6d6
| 111512 ||  || — || December 18, 2001 || Socorro || LINEAR || — || align=right | 6.4 km || 
|-id=513 bgcolor=#d6d6d6
| 111513 ||  || — || December 18, 2001 || Socorro || LINEAR || — || align=right | 4.2 km || 
|-id=514 bgcolor=#d6d6d6
| 111514 ||  || — || December 18, 2001 || Socorro || LINEAR || EOS || align=right | 3.4 km || 
|-id=515 bgcolor=#d6d6d6
| 111515 ||  || — || December 17, 2001 || Palomar || NEAT || — || align=right | 7.3 km || 
|-id=516 bgcolor=#d6d6d6
| 111516 ||  || — || December 17, 2001 || Palomar || NEAT || — || align=right | 5.8 km || 
|-id=517 bgcolor=#d6d6d6
| 111517 ||  || — || December 18, 2001 || Palomar || NEAT || — || align=right | 4.0 km || 
|-id=518 bgcolor=#E9E9E9
| 111518 ||  || — || December 18, 2001 || Palomar || NEAT || — || align=right | 5.1 km || 
|-id=519 bgcolor=#E9E9E9
| 111519 ||  || — || December 17, 2001 || Socorro || LINEAR || — || align=right | 2.8 km || 
|-id=520 bgcolor=#d6d6d6
| 111520 ||  || — || December 17, 2001 || Socorro || LINEAR || 7:4 || align=right | 8.4 km || 
|-id=521 bgcolor=#d6d6d6
| 111521 ||  || — || December 17, 2001 || Socorro || LINEAR || KOR || align=right | 3.0 km || 
|-id=522 bgcolor=#d6d6d6
| 111522 ||  || — || December 17, 2001 || Socorro || LINEAR || — || align=right | 4.7 km || 
|-id=523 bgcolor=#d6d6d6
| 111523 ||  || — || December 17, 2001 || Socorro || LINEAR || — || align=right | 7.3 km || 
|-id=524 bgcolor=#d6d6d6
| 111524 ||  || — || December 17, 2001 || Socorro || LINEAR || — || align=right | 4.3 km || 
|-id=525 bgcolor=#d6d6d6
| 111525 ||  || — || December 18, 2001 || Socorro || LINEAR || — || align=right | 13 km || 
|-id=526 bgcolor=#d6d6d6
| 111526 ||  || — || December 18, 2001 || Socorro || LINEAR || SYL7:4 || align=right | 11 km || 
|-id=527 bgcolor=#d6d6d6
| 111527 ||  || — || December 18, 2001 || Anderson Mesa || LONEOS || — || align=right | 7.3 km || 
|-id=528 bgcolor=#fefefe
| 111528 ||  || — || December 19, 2001 || Socorro || LINEAR || — || align=right | 1.5 km || 
|-id=529 bgcolor=#E9E9E9
| 111529 ||  || — || December 19, 2001 || Socorro || LINEAR || — || align=right | 3.0 km || 
|-id=530 bgcolor=#d6d6d6
| 111530 ||  || — || December 19, 2001 || Socorro || LINEAR || EOS || align=right | 4.3 km || 
|-id=531 bgcolor=#fefefe
| 111531 ||  || — || December 19, 2001 || Socorro || LINEAR || — || align=right | 1.9 km || 
|-id=532 bgcolor=#E9E9E9
| 111532 ||  || — || December 19, 2001 || Palomar || NEAT || — || align=right | 4.7 km || 
|-id=533 bgcolor=#E9E9E9
| 111533 ||  || — || December 17, 2001 || Socorro || LINEAR || — || align=right | 3.3 km || 
|-id=534 bgcolor=#E9E9E9
| 111534 ||  || — || December 18, 2001 || Socorro || LINEAR || — || align=right | 5.4 km || 
|-id=535 bgcolor=#d6d6d6
| 111535 ||  || — || December 18, 2001 || Socorro || LINEAR || — || align=right | 7.1 km || 
|-id=536 bgcolor=#E9E9E9
| 111536 ||  || — || December 18, 2001 || Socorro || LINEAR || EUN || align=right | 2.8 km || 
|-id=537 bgcolor=#fefefe
| 111537 ||  || — || December 19, 2001 || Socorro || LINEAR || V || align=right | 1.3 km || 
|-id=538 bgcolor=#d6d6d6
| 111538 ||  || — || December 17, 2001 || Socorro || LINEAR || EOS || align=right | 4.4 km || 
|-id=539 bgcolor=#d6d6d6
| 111539 ||  || — || December 17, 2001 || Socorro || LINEAR || — || align=right | 4.8 km || 
|-id=540 bgcolor=#E9E9E9
| 111540 ||  || — || December 18, 2001 || Socorro || LINEAR || — || align=right | 4.3 km || 
|-id=541 bgcolor=#d6d6d6
| 111541 ||  || — || December 19, 2001 || Socorro || LINEAR || — || align=right | 6.3 km || 
|-id=542 bgcolor=#d6d6d6
| 111542 ||  || — || December 17, 2001 || Kitt Peak || Spacewatch || — || align=right | 4.2 km || 
|-id=543 bgcolor=#E9E9E9
| 111543 ||  || — || December 17, 2001 || Socorro || LINEAR || — || align=right | 5.0 km || 
|-id=544 bgcolor=#E9E9E9
| 111544 ||  || — || December 18, 2001 || Socorro || LINEAR || — || align=right | 3.0 km || 
|-id=545 bgcolor=#fefefe
| 111545 ||  || — || December 18, 2001 || Socorro || LINEAR || NYS || align=right | 1.3 km || 
|-id=546 bgcolor=#d6d6d6
| 111546 ||  || — || December 21, 2001 || Socorro || LINEAR || HYG || align=right | 4.4 km || 
|-id=547 bgcolor=#E9E9E9
| 111547 ||  || — || December 22, 2001 || Socorro || LINEAR || — || align=right | 3.7 km || 
|-id=548 bgcolor=#E9E9E9
| 111548 ||  || — || December 22, 2001 || Socorro || LINEAR || MAR || align=right | 3.1 km || 
|-id=549 bgcolor=#E9E9E9
| 111549 ||  || — || December 22, 2001 || Socorro || LINEAR || — || align=right | 3.4 km || 
|-id=550 bgcolor=#d6d6d6
| 111550 ||  || — || December 22, 2001 || Socorro || LINEAR || — || align=right | 6.9 km || 
|-id=551 bgcolor=#d6d6d6
| 111551 ||  || — || December 22, 2001 || Socorro || LINEAR || — || align=right | 5.4 km || 
|-id=552 bgcolor=#E9E9E9
| 111552 ||  || — || December 22, 2001 || Socorro || LINEAR || — || align=right | 3.5 km || 
|-id=553 bgcolor=#d6d6d6
| 111553 ||  || — || December 22, 2001 || Socorro || LINEAR || EOS || align=right | 4.1 km || 
|-id=554 bgcolor=#E9E9E9
| 111554 ||  || — || December 17, 2001 || Socorro || LINEAR || NEM || align=right | 4.5 km || 
|-id=555 bgcolor=#d6d6d6
| 111555 ||  || — || December 19, 2001 || Palomar || NEAT || — || align=right | 8.5 km || 
|-id=556 bgcolor=#E9E9E9
| 111556 ||  || — || December 20, 2001 || Palomar || NEAT || MAR || align=right | 2.1 km || 
|-id=557 bgcolor=#d6d6d6
| 111557 ||  || — || December 20, 2001 || Palomar || NEAT || ALA || align=right | 8.6 km || 
|-id=558 bgcolor=#d6d6d6
| 111558 Barrett || 2002 AZ ||  || January 6, 2002 || Desert Moon || B. L. Stevens || EOS || align=right | 4.0 km || 
|-id=559 bgcolor=#E9E9E9
| 111559 ||  || — || January 5, 2002 || Socorro || LINEAR || — || align=right | 9.7 km || 
|-id=560 bgcolor=#fefefe
| 111560 ||  || — || January 6, 2002 || Socorro || LINEAR || H || align=right | 2.3 km || 
|-id=561 bgcolor=#E9E9E9
| 111561 Giovanniallevi ||  ||  || January 5, 2002 || Cima Ekar || ADAS || GEF || align=right | 2.3 km || 
|-id=562 bgcolor=#E9E9E9
| 111562 ||  || — || January 5, 2002 || Cima Ekar || ADAS || EUN || align=right | 2.9 km || 
|-id=563 bgcolor=#d6d6d6
| 111563 ||  || — || January 5, 2002 || Socorro || LINEAR || EUP || align=right | 7.5 km || 
|-id=564 bgcolor=#fefefe
| 111564 ||  || — || January 8, 2002 || Socorro || LINEAR || H || align=right | 1.1 km || 
|-id=565 bgcolor=#d6d6d6
| 111565 ||  || — || January 8, 2002 || Črni Vrh || Črni Vrh || HYG || align=right | 7.0 km || 
|-id=566 bgcolor=#E9E9E9
| 111566 ||  || — || January 6, 2002 || Socorro || LINEAR || GAL || align=right | 3.3 km || 
|-id=567 bgcolor=#d6d6d6
| 111567 ||  || — || January 5, 2002 || Cima Ekar || ADAS || EOS || align=right | 3.7 km || 
|-id=568 bgcolor=#fefefe
| 111568 ||  || — || January 11, 2002 || Desert Eagle || W. K. Y. Yeung || — || align=right | 1.8 km || 
|-id=569 bgcolor=#fefefe
| 111569 ||  || — || January 6, 2002 || Haleakala || NEAT || — || align=right | 2.2 km || 
|-id=570 bgcolor=#d6d6d6
| 111570 Ágasvár ||  ||  || January 11, 2002 || Piszkéstető || K. Sárneczky, Z. Heiner || — || align=right | 5.0 km || 
|-id=571 bgcolor=#C2FFFF
| 111571 Bebevio ||  ||  || January 11, 2002 || Campo Imperatore || F. Bernardi, M. Tombelli || L4 || align=right | 14 km || 
|-id=572 bgcolor=#fefefe
| 111572 ||  || — || January 11, 2002 || Desert Eagle || W. K. Y. Yeung || V || align=right | 1.6 km || 
|-id=573 bgcolor=#d6d6d6
| 111573 ||  || — || January 4, 2002 || Haleakala || NEAT || — || align=right | 7.4 km || 
|-id=574 bgcolor=#d6d6d6
| 111574 ||  || — || January 5, 2002 || Haleakala || NEAT || EOS || align=right | 5.0 km || 
|-id=575 bgcolor=#d6d6d6
| 111575 ||  || — || January 5, 2002 || Haleakala || NEAT || KOR || align=right | 2.5 km || 
|-id=576 bgcolor=#E9E9E9
| 111576 ||  || — || January 6, 2002 || Haleakala || NEAT || — || align=right | 5.4 km || 
|-id=577 bgcolor=#d6d6d6
| 111577 ||  || — || January 8, 2002 || Palomar || NEAT || — || align=right | 4.4 km || 
|-id=578 bgcolor=#d6d6d6
| 111578 ||  || — || January 7, 2002 || Anderson Mesa || LONEOS || — || align=right | 7.2 km || 
|-id=579 bgcolor=#E9E9E9
| 111579 ||  || — || January 7, 2002 || Anderson Mesa || LONEOS || — || align=right | 4.5 km || 
|-id=580 bgcolor=#fefefe
| 111580 ||  || — || January 12, 2002 || Palomar || NEAT || FLO || align=right | 1.7 km || 
|-id=581 bgcolor=#d6d6d6
| 111581 ||  || — || January 9, 2002 || Socorro || LINEAR || — || align=right | 7.6 km || 
|-id=582 bgcolor=#d6d6d6
| 111582 ||  || — || January 9, 2002 || Socorro || LINEAR || — || align=right | 5.4 km || 
|-id=583 bgcolor=#fefefe
| 111583 ||  || — || January 9, 2002 || Socorro || LINEAR || — || align=right | 1.5 km || 
|-id=584 bgcolor=#d6d6d6
| 111584 ||  || — || January 9, 2002 || Socorro || LINEAR || EOS || align=right | 3.9 km || 
|-id=585 bgcolor=#d6d6d6
| 111585 ||  || — || January 9, 2002 || Socorro || LINEAR || VER || align=right | 8.4 km || 
|-id=586 bgcolor=#d6d6d6
| 111586 ||  || — || January 9, 2002 || Socorro || LINEAR || URS || align=right | 6.0 km || 
|-id=587 bgcolor=#fefefe
| 111587 ||  || — || January 9, 2002 || Socorro || LINEAR || MAS || align=right | 1.7 km || 
|-id=588 bgcolor=#d6d6d6
| 111588 ||  || — || January 9, 2002 || Socorro || LINEAR || — || align=right | 5.1 km || 
|-id=589 bgcolor=#d6d6d6
| 111589 ||  || — || January 9, 2002 || Socorro || LINEAR || — || align=right | 3.6 km || 
|-id=590 bgcolor=#d6d6d6
| 111590 ||  || — || January 9, 2002 || Socorro || LINEAR || THM || align=right | 3.8 km || 
|-id=591 bgcolor=#d6d6d6
| 111591 ||  || — || January 9, 2002 || Socorro || LINEAR || THM || align=right | 5.0 km || 
|-id=592 bgcolor=#d6d6d6
| 111592 ||  || — || January 11, 2002 || Socorro || LINEAR || — || align=right | 7.2 km || 
|-id=593 bgcolor=#d6d6d6
| 111593 ||  || — || January 11, 2002 || Socorro || LINEAR || — || align=right | 7.2 km || 
|-id=594 bgcolor=#fefefe
| 111594 Ráktanya ||  ||  || January 11, 2002 || Piszkéstető || K. Sárneczky, Z. Heiner || NYS || align=right | 1.1 km || 
|-id=595 bgcolor=#E9E9E9
| 111595 ||  || — || January 13, 2002 || Needville || Needville Obs. || DOR || align=right | 3.7 km || 
|-id=596 bgcolor=#fefefe
| 111596 ||  || — || January 8, 2002 || Socorro || LINEAR || FLO || align=right | 1.6 km || 
|-id=597 bgcolor=#d6d6d6
| 111597 ||  || — || January 8, 2002 || Socorro || LINEAR || — || align=right | 3.6 km || 
|-id=598 bgcolor=#d6d6d6
| 111598 ||  || — || January 8, 2002 || Socorro || LINEAR || — || align=right | 3.6 km || 
|-id=599 bgcolor=#fefefe
| 111599 ||  || — || January 8, 2002 || Socorro || LINEAR || — || align=right | 1.5 km || 
|-id=600 bgcolor=#fefefe
| 111600 ||  || — || January 8, 2002 || Socorro || LINEAR || — || align=right | 1.8 km || 
|}

111601–111700 

|-bgcolor=#E9E9E9
| 111601 ||  || — || January 8, 2002 || Socorro || LINEAR || — || align=right | 3.9 km || 
|-id=602 bgcolor=#E9E9E9
| 111602 ||  || — || January 9, 2002 || Socorro || LINEAR || — || align=right | 3.8 km || 
|-id=603 bgcolor=#d6d6d6
| 111603 ||  || — || January 9, 2002 || Socorro || LINEAR || — || align=right | 5.6 km || 
|-id=604 bgcolor=#d6d6d6
| 111604 ||  || — || January 9, 2002 || Socorro || LINEAR || EOS || align=right | 4.0 km || 
|-id=605 bgcolor=#E9E9E9
| 111605 ||  || — || January 9, 2002 || Socorro || LINEAR || — || align=right | 4.1 km || 
|-id=606 bgcolor=#d6d6d6
| 111606 ||  || — || January 9, 2002 || Socorro || LINEAR || — || align=right | 6.1 km || 
|-id=607 bgcolor=#d6d6d6
| 111607 ||  || — || January 9, 2002 || Socorro || LINEAR || — || align=right | 8.5 km || 
|-id=608 bgcolor=#d6d6d6
| 111608 ||  || — || January 8, 2002 || Socorro || LINEAR || — || align=right | 6.4 km || 
|-id=609 bgcolor=#d6d6d6
| 111609 ||  || — || January 8, 2002 || Socorro || LINEAR || THM || align=right | 5.0 km || 
|-id=610 bgcolor=#d6d6d6
| 111610 ||  || — || January 8, 2002 || Socorro || LINEAR || KOR || align=right | 2.8 km || 
|-id=611 bgcolor=#fefefe
| 111611 ||  || — || January 9, 2002 || Socorro || LINEAR || — || align=right | 1.8 km || 
|-id=612 bgcolor=#d6d6d6
| 111612 ||  || — || January 9, 2002 || Socorro || LINEAR || — || align=right | 5.0 km || 
|-id=613 bgcolor=#fefefe
| 111613 ||  || — || January 9, 2002 || Socorro || LINEAR || V || align=right | 1.2 km || 
|-id=614 bgcolor=#d6d6d6
| 111614 ||  || — || January 9, 2002 || Socorro || LINEAR || — || align=right | 8.0 km || 
|-id=615 bgcolor=#d6d6d6
| 111615 ||  || — || January 9, 2002 || Socorro || LINEAR || — || align=right | 4.1 km || 
|-id=616 bgcolor=#fefefe
| 111616 ||  || — || January 9, 2002 || Socorro || LINEAR || — || align=right | 1.7 km || 
|-id=617 bgcolor=#d6d6d6
| 111617 ||  || — || January 9, 2002 || Socorro || LINEAR || URS || align=right | 8.0 km || 
|-id=618 bgcolor=#d6d6d6
| 111618 ||  || — || January 9, 2002 || Socorro || LINEAR || — || align=right | 7.7 km || 
|-id=619 bgcolor=#fefefe
| 111619 ||  || — || January 9, 2002 || Socorro || LINEAR || — || align=right | 1.6 km || 
|-id=620 bgcolor=#E9E9E9
| 111620 ||  || — || January 9, 2002 || Socorro || LINEAR || RAF || align=right | 2.4 km || 
|-id=621 bgcolor=#d6d6d6
| 111621 ||  || — || January 9, 2002 || Socorro || LINEAR || — || align=right | 6.1 km || 
|-id=622 bgcolor=#fefefe
| 111622 ||  || — || January 9, 2002 || Socorro || LINEAR || — || align=right | 1.7 km || 
|-id=623 bgcolor=#d6d6d6
| 111623 ||  || — || January 9, 2002 || Socorro || LINEAR || — || align=right | 4.9 km || 
|-id=624 bgcolor=#fefefe
| 111624 ||  || — || January 11, 2002 || Socorro || LINEAR || NYS || align=right | 1.2 km || 
|-id=625 bgcolor=#d6d6d6
| 111625 ||  || — || January 13, 2002 || Socorro || LINEAR || THM || align=right | 4.7 km || 
|-id=626 bgcolor=#fefefe
| 111626 ||  || — || January 14, 2002 || Desert Eagle || W. K. Y. Yeung || FLO || align=right | 1.4 km || 
|-id=627 bgcolor=#fefefe
| 111627 ||  || — || January 14, 2002 || Socorro || LINEAR || H || align=right | 1.2 km || 
|-id=628 bgcolor=#fefefe
| 111628 ||  || — || January 8, 2002 || Socorro || LINEAR || H || align=right | 1.6 km || 
|-id=629 bgcolor=#d6d6d6
| 111629 ||  || — || January 9, 2002 || Socorro || LINEAR || — || align=right | 5.1 km || 
|-id=630 bgcolor=#E9E9E9
| 111630 ||  || — || January 9, 2002 || Socorro || LINEAR || — || align=right | 5.3 km || 
|-id=631 bgcolor=#fefefe
| 111631 ||  || — || January 13, 2002 || Socorro || LINEAR || — || align=right | 1.4 km || 
|-id=632 bgcolor=#fefefe
| 111632 ||  || — || January 13, 2002 || Socorro || LINEAR || V || align=right | 1.1 km || 
|-id=633 bgcolor=#d6d6d6
| 111633 ||  || — || January 14, 2002 || Socorro || LINEAR || CRO || align=right | 6.1 km || 
|-id=634 bgcolor=#d6d6d6
| 111634 ||  || — || January 14, 2002 || Socorro || LINEAR || — || align=right | 5.6 km || 
|-id=635 bgcolor=#d6d6d6
| 111635 ||  || — || January 14, 2002 || Socorro || LINEAR || EOS || align=right | 4.0 km || 
|-id=636 bgcolor=#d6d6d6
| 111636 ||  || — || January 14, 2002 || Socorro || LINEAR || TRP || align=right | 4.4 km || 
|-id=637 bgcolor=#d6d6d6
| 111637 ||  || — || January 14, 2002 || Socorro || LINEAR || — || align=right | 4.6 km || 
|-id=638 bgcolor=#d6d6d6
| 111638 ||  || — || January 14, 2002 || Socorro || LINEAR || EOS || align=right | 4.1 km || 
|-id=639 bgcolor=#d6d6d6
| 111639 ||  || — || January 13, 2002 || Socorro || LINEAR || — || align=right | 3.8 km || 
|-id=640 bgcolor=#d6d6d6
| 111640 ||  || — || January 13, 2002 || Socorro || LINEAR || — || align=right | 4.2 km || 
|-id=641 bgcolor=#fefefe
| 111641 ||  || — || January 13, 2002 || Socorro || LINEAR || FLO || align=right | 1.2 km || 
|-id=642 bgcolor=#E9E9E9
| 111642 ||  || — || January 13, 2002 || Socorro || LINEAR || DOR || align=right | 4.5 km || 
|-id=643 bgcolor=#d6d6d6
| 111643 ||  || — || January 14, 2002 || Socorro || LINEAR || — || align=right | 6.5 km || 
|-id=644 bgcolor=#d6d6d6
| 111644 ||  || — || January 14, 2002 || Socorro || LINEAR || THM || align=right | 4.2 km || 
|-id=645 bgcolor=#d6d6d6
| 111645 ||  || — || January 14, 2002 || Socorro || LINEAR || THM || align=right | 5.9 km || 
|-id=646 bgcolor=#E9E9E9
| 111646 ||  || — || January 14, 2002 || Socorro || LINEAR || — || align=right | 2.2 km || 
|-id=647 bgcolor=#d6d6d6
| 111647 ||  || — || January 14, 2002 || Socorro || LINEAR || — || align=right | 5.2 km || 
|-id=648 bgcolor=#E9E9E9
| 111648 ||  || — || January 5, 2002 || Palomar || NEAT || — || align=right | 3.5 km || 
|-id=649 bgcolor=#E9E9E9
| 111649 ||  || — || January 5, 2002 || Palomar || NEAT || — || align=right | 5.3 km || 
|-id=650 bgcolor=#d6d6d6
| 111650 ||  || — || January 5, 2002 || Haleakala || NEAT || — || align=right | 7.4 km || 
|-id=651 bgcolor=#E9E9E9
| 111651 ||  || — || January 6, 2002 || Palomar || NEAT || MRX || align=right | 1.8 km || 
|-id=652 bgcolor=#E9E9E9
| 111652 ||  || — || January 6, 2002 || Kitt Peak || Spacewatch || — || align=right | 3.8 km || 
|-id=653 bgcolor=#E9E9E9
| 111653 ||  || — || January 7, 2002 || Anderson Mesa || LONEOS || — || align=right | 3.9 km || 
|-id=654 bgcolor=#d6d6d6
| 111654 ||  || — || January 7, 2002 || Anderson Mesa || LONEOS || — || align=right | 7.0 km || 
|-id=655 bgcolor=#fefefe
| 111655 ||  || — || January 8, 2002 || Socorro || LINEAR || — || align=right | 1.5 km || 
|-id=656 bgcolor=#E9E9E9
| 111656 ||  || — || January 8, 2002 || Socorro || LINEAR || — || align=right | 3.3 km || 
|-id=657 bgcolor=#d6d6d6
| 111657 ||  || — || January 8, 2002 || Socorro || LINEAR || ALA || align=right | 6.6 km || 
|-id=658 bgcolor=#d6d6d6
| 111658 ||  || — || January 12, 2002 || Kitt Peak || Spacewatch || — || align=right | 5.0 km || 
|-id=659 bgcolor=#fefefe
| 111659 ||  || — || January 8, 2002 || Socorro || LINEAR || V || align=right | 1.3 km || 
|-id=660 bgcolor=#d6d6d6
| 111660 Jimgray ||  ||  || January 13, 2002 || Apache Point || SDSS || — || align=right | 5.6 km || 
|-id=661 bgcolor=#FA8072
| 111661 Mamiegeorge || 2002 BP ||  || January 16, 2002 || Needville || W. G. Dillon, J. Dellinger || H || align=right | 1.6 km || 
|-id=662 bgcolor=#d6d6d6
| 111662 ||  || — || January 20, 2002 || Anderson Mesa || LONEOS || — || align=right | 5.7 km || 
|-id=663 bgcolor=#d6d6d6
| 111663 ||  || — || January 19, 2002 || Anderson Mesa || LONEOS || URS || align=right | 6.6 km || 
|-id=664 bgcolor=#fefefe
| 111664 ||  || — || January 19, 2002 || Anderson Mesa || LONEOS || H || align=right | 1.2 km || 
|-id=665 bgcolor=#d6d6d6
| 111665 ||  || — || January 19, 2002 || Anderson Mesa || LONEOS || — || align=right | 7.5 km || 
|-id=666 bgcolor=#d6d6d6
| 111666 ||  || — || January 18, 2002 || Socorro || LINEAR || — || align=right | 6.6 km || 
|-id=667 bgcolor=#d6d6d6
| 111667 ||  || — || January 18, 2002 || Socorro || LINEAR || — || align=right | 4.0 km || 
|-id=668 bgcolor=#fefefe
| 111668 ||  || — || January 18, 2002 || Socorro || LINEAR || NYS || align=right | 1.6 km || 
|-id=669 bgcolor=#d6d6d6
| 111669 ||  || — || January 18, 2002 || Socorro || LINEAR || — || align=right | 7.4 km || 
|-id=670 bgcolor=#d6d6d6
| 111670 ||  || — || January 18, 2002 || Socorro || LINEAR || EOS || align=right | 3.5 km || 
|-id=671 bgcolor=#fefefe
| 111671 ||  || — || January 18, 2002 || Socorro || LINEAR || V || align=right | 1.4 km || 
|-id=672 bgcolor=#d6d6d6
| 111672 ||  || — || January 18, 2002 || Socorro || LINEAR || VER || align=right | 5.4 km || 
|-id=673 bgcolor=#d6d6d6
| 111673 ||  || — || January 19, 2002 || Socorro || LINEAR || — || align=right | 6.7 km || 
|-id=674 bgcolor=#d6d6d6
| 111674 ||  || — || January 21, 2002 || Palomar || NEAT || HYG || align=right | 5.2 km || 
|-id=675 bgcolor=#fefefe
| 111675 ||  || — || January 25, 2002 || Socorro || LINEAR || H || align=right | 2.1 km || 
|-id=676 bgcolor=#d6d6d6
| 111676 ||  || — || January 25, 2002 || Socorro || LINEAR || Tj (2.93) || align=right | 5.0 km || 
|-id=677 bgcolor=#E9E9E9
| 111677 ||  || — || January 25, 2002 || Socorro || LINEAR || BRU || align=right | 7.8 km || 
|-id=678 bgcolor=#fefefe
| 111678 ||  || — || January 25, 2002 || Socorro || LINEAR || PHO || align=right | 2.7 km || 
|-id=679 bgcolor=#fefefe
| 111679 ||  || — || January 25, 2002 || Socorro || LINEAR || H || align=right data-sort-value="0.97" | 970 m || 
|-id=680 bgcolor=#E9E9E9
| 111680 ||  || — || January 23, 2002 || Socorro || LINEAR || — || align=right | 3.3 km || 
|-id=681 bgcolor=#d6d6d6
| 111681 ||  || — || January 23, 2002 || Socorro || LINEAR || — || align=right | 2.7 km || 
|-id=682 bgcolor=#d6d6d6
| 111682 ||  || — || January 23, 2002 || Socorro || LINEAR || ALA || align=right | 7.0 km || 
|-id=683 bgcolor=#d6d6d6
| 111683 ||  || — || January 23, 2002 || Socorro || LINEAR || EOS || align=right | 5.5 km || 
|-id=684 bgcolor=#d6d6d6
| 111684 ||  || — || January 23, 2002 || Socorro || LINEAR || — || align=right | 4.9 km || 
|-id=685 bgcolor=#fefefe
| 111685 ||  || — || January 20, 2002 || Anderson Mesa || LONEOS || FLO || align=right | 2.3 km || 
|-id=686 bgcolor=#d6d6d6
| 111686 ||  || — || January 21, 2002 || Anderson Mesa || LONEOS || ARM || align=right | 6.8 km || 
|-id=687 bgcolor=#E9E9E9
| 111687 || 2002 CA || — || February 1, 2002 || Socorro || LINEAR || HNS || align=right | 3.9 km || 
|-id=688 bgcolor=#fefefe
| 111688 ||  || — || February 3, 2002 || Palomar || NEAT || FLO || align=right | 2.6 km || 
|-id=689 bgcolor=#d6d6d6
| 111689 ||  || — || February 4, 2002 || Haleakala || NEAT || — || align=right | 7.0 km || 
|-id=690 bgcolor=#d6d6d6
| 111690 ||  || — || February 1, 2002 || Socorro || LINEAR || EUP || align=right | 9.6 km || 
|-id=691 bgcolor=#fefefe
| 111691 ||  || — || February 6, 2002 || Socorro || LINEAR || H || align=right | 1.2 km || 
|-id=692 bgcolor=#fefefe
| 111692 ||  || — || February 6, 2002 || Socorro || LINEAR || H || align=right | 1.1 km || 
|-id=693 bgcolor=#fefefe
| 111693 ||  || — || February 6, 2002 || Socorro || LINEAR || H || align=right | 1.9 km || 
|-id=694 bgcolor=#fefefe
| 111694 ||  || — || February 6, 2002 || Socorro || LINEAR || H || align=right | 1.7 km || 
|-id=695 bgcolor=#fefefe
| 111695 ||  || — || February 8, 2002 || Desert Eagle || W. K. Y. Yeung || — || align=right | 1.6 km || 
|-id=696 bgcolor=#d6d6d6
| 111696 Helenorman ||  ||  || February 8, 2002 || Needville || Needville Obs. || — || align=right | 4.8 km || 
|-id=697 bgcolor=#d6d6d6
| 111697 ||  || — || February 9, 2002 || Desert Eagle || W. K. Y. Yeung || — || align=right | 4.1 km || 
|-id=698 bgcolor=#d6d6d6
| 111698 ||  || — || February 9, 2002 || Desert Eagle || W. K. Y. Yeung || — || align=right | 5.0 km || 
|-id=699 bgcolor=#E9E9E9
| 111699 ||  || — || February 8, 2002 || Fountain Hills || C. W. Juels, P. R. Holvorcem || — || align=right | 5.1 km || 
|-id=700 bgcolor=#d6d6d6
| 111700 ||  || — || February 6, 2002 || Socorro || LINEAR || EOS || align=right | 4.3 km || 
|}

111701–111800 

|-bgcolor=#d6d6d6
| 111701 ||  || — || February 4, 2002 || Palomar || NEAT || HYG || align=right | 5.2 km || 
|-id=702 bgcolor=#d6d6d6
| 111702 ||  || — || February 5, 2002 || Palomar || NEAT || — || align=right | 6.0 km || 
|-id=703 bgcolor=#d6d6d6
| 111703 ||  || — || February 5, 2002 || Palomar || NEAT || — || align=right | 5.0 km || 
|-id=704 bgcolor=#d6d6d6
| 111704 ||  || — || February 6, 2002 || Haleakala || NEAT || — || align=right | 8.0 km || 
|-id=705 bgcolor=#fefefe
| 111705 ||  || — || February 7, 2002 || Socorro || LINEAR || — || align=right | 1.4 km || 
|-id=706 bgcolor=#E9E9E9
| 111706 ||  || — || February 6, 2002 || Socorro || LINEAR || EUN || align=right | 4.1 km || 
|-id=707 bgcolor=#d6d6d6
| 111707 ||  || — || February 6, 2002 || Socorro || LINEAR || BRA || align=right | 3.5 km || 
|-id=708 bgcolor=#E9E9E9
| 111708 ||  || — || February 6, 2002 || Socorro || LINEAR || EUN || align=right | 3.4 km || 
|-id=709 bgcolor=#d6d6d6
| 111709 ||  || — || February 6, 2002 || Socorro || LINEAR || — || align=right | 8.2 km || 
|-id=710 bgcolor=#fefefe
| 111710 ||  || — || February 6, 2002 || Socorro || LINEAR || FLO || align=right | 1.0 km || 
|-id=711 bgcolor=#fefefe
| 111711 ||  || — || February 6, 2002 || Socorro || LINEAR || — || align=right | 1.9 km || 
|-id=712 bgcolor=#fefefe
| 111712 ||  || — || February 6, 2002 || Socorro || LINEAR || V || align=right | 1.2 km || 
|-id=713 bgcolor=#d6d6d6
| 111713 ||  || — || February 6, 2002 || Socorro || LINEAR || VER || align=right | 5.4 km || 
|-id=714 bgcolor=#d6d6d6
| 111714 ||  || — || February 6, 2002 || Socorro || LINEAR || HYG || align=right | 6.0 km || 
|-id=715 bgcolor=#d6d6d6
| 111715 ||  || — || February 6, 2002 || Socorro || LINEAR || — || align=right | 5.0 km || 
|-id=716 bgcolor=#d6d6d6
| 111716 ||  || — || February 6, 2002 || Socorro || LINEAR || — || align=right | 7.0 km || 
|-id=717 bgcolor=#fefefe
| 111717 ||  || — || February 7, 2002 || Socorro || LINEAR || FLO || align=right | 1.6 km || 
|-id=718 bgcolor=#fefefe
| 111718 ||  || — || February 7, 2002 || Socorro || LINEAR || — || align=right | 3.4 km || 
|-id=719 bgcolor=#d6d6d6
| 111719 ||  || — || February 7, 2002 || Socorro || LINEAR || — || align=right | 5.3 km || 
|-id=720 bgcolor=#d6d6d6
| 111720 ||  || — || February 7, 2002 || Haleakala || NEAT || — || align=right | 3.8 km || 
|-id=721 bgcolor=#E9E9E9
| 111721 ||  || — || February 7, 2002 || Haleakala || NEAT || EUN || align=right | 2.4 km || 
|-id=722 bgcolor=#E9E9E9
| 111722 ||  || — || February 12, 2002 || Fountain Hills || C. W. Juels, P. R. Holvorcem || — || align=right | 2.7 km || 
|-id=723 bgcolor=#d6d6d6
| 111723 ||  || — || February 8, 2002 || Palomar || NEAT || — || align=right | 7.7 km || 
|-id=724 bgcolor=#E9E9E9
| 111724 ||  || — || February 3, 2002 || Haleakala || NEAT || — || align=right | 2.6 km || 
|-id=725 bgcolor=#d6d6d6
| 111725 ||  || — || February 3, 2002 || Haleakala || NEAT || — || align=right | 6.9 km || 
|-id=726 bgcolor=#fefefe
| 111726 ||  || — || February 11, 2002 || Desert Eagle || W. K. Y. Yeung || — || align=right | 1.2 km || 
|-id=727 bgcolor=#d6d6d6
| 111727 ||  || — || February 12, 2002 || Desert Eagle || W. K. Y. Yeung || — || align=right | 4.8 km || 
|-id=728 bgcolor=#fefefe
| 111728 ||  || — || February 12, 2002 || Desert Eagle || W. K. Y. Yeung || — || align=right | 1.3 km || 
|-id=729 bgcolor=#d6d6d6
| 111729 ||  || — || February 7, 2002 || Socorro || LINEAR || HYG || align=right | 6.1 km || 
|-id=730 bgcolor=#fefefe
| 111730 ||  || — || February 7, 2002 || Socorro || LINEAR || FLO || align=right | 1.3 km || 
|-id=731 bgcolor=#d6d6d6
| 111731 ||  || — || February 8, 2002 || Socorro || LINEAR || — || align=right | 5.9 km || 
|-id=732 bgcolor=#fefefe
| 111732 ||  || — || February 6, 2002 || Socorro || LINEAR || V || align=right | 1.9 km || 
|-id=733 bgcolor=#fefefe
| 111733 ||  || — || February 6, 2002 || Socorro || LINEAR || V || align=right | 1.4 km || 
|-id=734 bgcolor=#d6d6d6
| 111734 ||  || — || February 6, 2002 || Socorro || LINEAR || — || align=right | 3.7 km || 
|-id=735 bgcolor=#d6d6d6
| 111735 ||  || — || February 7, 2002 || Socorro || LINEAR || — || align=right | 6.8 km || 
|-id=736 bgcolor=#C2FFFF
| 111736 ||  || — || February 7, 2002 || Socorro || LINEAR || L4 || align=right | 12 km || 
|-id=737 bgcolor=#fefefe
| 111737 ||  || — || February 7, 2002 || Socorro || LINEAR || — || align=right data-sort-value="0.86" | 860 m || 
|-id=738 bgcolor=#d6d6d6
| 111738 ||  || — || February 7, 2002 || Socorro || LINEAR || URS || align=right | 7.0 km || 
|-id=739 bgcolor=#d6d6d6
| 111739 ||  || — || February 7, 2002 || Socorro || LINEAR || THM || align=right | 5.3 km || 
|-id=740 bgcolor=#d6d6d6
| 111740 ||  || — || February 7, 2002 || Socorro || LINEAR || — || align=right | 7.2 km || 
|-id=741 bgcolor=#fefefe
| 111741 ||  || — || February 7, 2002 || Socorro || LINEAR || — || align=right | 1.4 km || 
|-id=742 bgcolor=#d6d6d6
| 111742 ||  || — || February 7, 2002 || Socorro || LINEAR || HYG || align=right | 6.0 km || 
|-id=743 bgcolor=#d6d6d6
| 111743 ||  || — || February 7, 2002 || Socorro || LINEAR || HIL3:2 || align=right | 14 km || 
|-id=744 bgcolor=#E9E9E9
| 111744 ||  || — || February 7, 2002 || Socorro || LINEAR || — || align=right | 1.7 km || 
|-id=745 bgcolor=#d6d6d6
| 111745 ||  || — || February 7, 2002 || Socorro || LINEAR || ALA || align=right | 7.0 km || 
|-id=746 bgcolor=#fefefe
| 111746 ||  || — || February 7, 2002 || Socorro || LINEAR || NYS || align=right | 1.3 km || 
|-id=747 bgcolor=#d6d6d6
| 111747 ||  || — || February 7, 2002 || Socorro || LINEAR || — || align=right | 7.4 km || 
|-id=748 bgcolor=#fefefe
| 111748 ||  || — || February 7, 2002 || Socorro || LINEAR || — || align=right | 1.6 km || 
|-id=749 bgcolor=#d6d6d6
| 111749 ||  || — || February 8, 2002 || Socorro || LINEAR || EOS || align=right | 3.6 km || 
|-id=750 bgcolor=#fefefe
| 111750 ||  || — || February 8, 2002 || Socorro || LINEAR || FLO || align=right | 1.3 km || 
|-id=751 bgcolor=#fefefe
| 111751 ||  || — || February 8, 2002 || Socorro || LINEAR || — || align=right | 1.0 km || 
|-id=752 bgcolor=#E9E9E9
| 111752 ||  || — || February 8, 2002 || Needville || Needville Obs. || — || align=right | 3.4 km || 
|-id=753 bgcolor=#fefefe
| 111753 ||  || — || February 13, 2002 || Socorro || LINEAR || H || align=right | 1.3 km || 
|-id=754 bgcolor=#d6d6d6
| 111754 ||  || — || February 7, 2002 || Socorro || LINEAR || — || align=right | 5.1 km || 
|-id=755 bgcolor=#d6d6d6
| 111755 ||  || — || February 7, 2002 || Socorro || LINEAR || — || align=right | 4.2 km || 
|-id=756 bgcolor=#d6d6d6
| 111756 ||  || — || February 7, 2002 || Socorro || LINEAR || — || align=right | 6.6 km || 
|-id=757 bgcolor=#E9E9E9
| 111757 ||  || — || February 7, 2002 || Socorro || LINEAR || — || align=right | 4.7 km || 
|-id=758 bgcolor=#fefefe
| 111758 ||  || — || February 7, 2002 || Socorro || LINEAR || — || align=right | 1.8 km || 
|-id=759 bgcolor=#E9E9E9
| 111759 ||  || — || February 7, 2002 || Socorro || LINEAR || DOR || align=right | 5.2 km || 
|-id=760 bgcolor=#d6d6d6
| 111760 ||  || — || February 7, 2002 || Socorro || LINEAR || — || align=right | 4.3 km || 
|-id=761 bgcolor=#d6d6d6
| 111761 ||  || — || February 7, 2002 || Socorro || LINEAR || — || align=right | 6.4 km || 
|-id=762 bgcolor=#d6d6d6
| 111762 ||  || — || February 7, 2002 || Socorro || LINEAR || — || align=right | 7.2 km || 
|-id=763 bgcolor=#fefefe
| 111763 ||  || — || February 7, 2002 || Socorro || LINEAR || NYS || align=right | 1.6 km || 
|-id=764 bgcolor=#E9E9E9
| 111764 ||  || — || February 7, 2002 || Socorro || LINEAR || — || align=right | 3.6 km || 
|-id=765 bgcolor=#d6d6d6
| 111765 ||  || — || February 8, 2002 || Socorro || LINEAR || — || align=right | 5.8 km || 
|-id=766 bgcolor=#fefefe
| 111766 ||  || — || February 8, 2002 || Socorro || LINEAR || — || align=right | 2.1 km || 
|-id=767 bgcolor=#E9E9E9
| 111767 ||  || — || February 8, 2002 || Socorro || LINEAR || DOR || align=right | 3.7 km || 
|-id=768 bgcolor=#fefefe
| 111768 ||  || — || February 9, 2002 || Socorro || LINEAR || — || align=right | 1.4 km || 
|-id=769 bgcolor=#fefefe
| 111769 ||  || — || February 8, 2002 || Socorro || LINEAR || H || align=right | 1.1 km || 
|-id=770 bgcolor=#C2FFFF
| 111770 ||  || — || February 11, 2002 || Socorro || LINEAR || L4 || align=right | 14 km || 
|-id=771 bgcolor=#C2FFFF
| 111771 ||  || — || February 11, 2002 || Socorro || LINEAR || L4 || align=right | 13 km || 
|-id=772 bgcolor=#fefefe
| 111772 ||  || — || February 6, 2002 || Socorro || LINEAR || H || align=right | 1.2 km || 
|-id=773 bgcolor=#d6d6d6
| 111773 ||  || — || February 9, 2002 || Kitt Peak || Spacewatch || THM || align=right | 4.1 km || 
|-id=774 bgcolor=#fefefe
| 111774 ||  || — || February 7, 2002 || Socorro || LINEAR || — || align=right | 1.2 km || 
|-id=775 bgcolor=#d6d6d6
| 111775 ||  || — || February 8, 2002 || Socorro || LINEAR || HYG || align=right | 6.2 km || 
|-id=776 bgcolor=#E9E9E9
| 111776 ||  || — || February 8, 2002 || Socorro || LINEAR || — || align=right | 6.3 km || 
|-id=777 bgcolor=#fefefe
| 111777 ||  || — || February 8, 2002 || Socorro || LINEAR || — || align=right | 2.8 km || 
|-id=778 bgcolor=#d6d6d6
| 111778 ||  || — || February 8, 2002 || Socorro || LINEAR || HYG || align=right | 5.4 km || 
|-id=779 bgcolor=#fefefe
| 111779 ||  || — || February 8, 2002 || Socorro || LINEAR || — || align=right | 1.6 km || 
|-id=780 bgcolor=#fefefe
| 111780 ||  || — || February 8, 2002 || Socorro || LINEAR || — || align=right | 1.9 km || 
|-id=781 bgcolor=#E9E9E9
| 111781 ||  || — || February 10, 2002 || Socorro || LINEAR || DOR || align=right | 4.2 km || 
|-id=782 bgcolor=#d6d6d6
| 111782 ||  || — || February 10, 2002 || Socorro || LINEAR || — || align=right | 3.6 km || 
|-id=783 bgcolor=#d6d6d6
| 111783 ||  || — || February 10, 2002 || Socorro || LINEAR || — || align=right | 4.1 km || 
|-id=784 bgcolor=#fefefe
| 111784 ||  || — || February 10, 2002 || Socorro || LINEAR || — || align=right | 1.4 km || 
|-id=785 bgcolor=#C2FFFF
| 111785 ||  || — || February 10, 2002 || Socorro || LINEAR || L4 || align=right | 13 km || 
|-id=786 bgcolor=#fefefe
| 111786 ||  || — || February 10, 2002 || Socorro || LINEAR || FLO || align=right data-sort-value="0.98" | 980 m || 
|-id=787 bgcolor=#d6d6d6
| 111787 ||  || — || February 10, 2002 || Socorro || LINEAR || — || align=right | 4.2 km || 
|-id=788 bgcolor=#fefefe
| 111788 ||  || — || February 8, 2002 || Socorro || LINEAR || — || align=right | 1.9 km || 
|-id=789 bgcolor=#fefefe
| 111789 ||  || — || February 8, 2002 || Socorro || LINEAR || ERI || align=right | 4.0 km || 
|-id=790 bgcolor=#fefefe
| 111790 ||  || — || February 11, 2002 || Socorro || LINEAR || — || align=right | 1.6 km || 
|-id=791 bgcolor=#fefefe
| 111791 ||  || — || February 11, 2002 || Socorro || LINEAR || NYS || align=right | 2.7 km || 
|-id=792 bgcolor=#fefefe
| 111792 ||  || — || February 11, 2002 || Socorro || LINEAR || FLO || align=right | 1.1 km || 
|-id=793 bgcolor=#fefefe
| 111793 ||  || — || February 11, 2002 || Socorro || LINEAR || FLO || align=right | 1.7 km || 
|-id=794 bgcolor=#fefefe
| 111794 ||  || — || February 11, 2002 || Socorro || LINEAR || — || align=right | 1.6 km || 
|-id=795 bgcolor=#d6d6d6
| 111795 ||  || — || February 11, 2002 || Socorro || LINEAR || HYG || align=right | 5.3 km || 
|-id=796 bgcolor=#fefefe
| 111796 ||  || — || February 11, 2002 || Socorro || LINEAR || — || align=right | 1.5 km || 
|-id=797 bgcolor=#E9E9E9
| 111797 ||  || — || February 11, 2002 || Socorro || LINEAR || HEN || align=right | 2.5 km || 
|-id=798 bgcolor=#d6d6d6
| 111798 ||  || — || February 11, 2002 || Socorro || LINEAR || LUT || align=right | 6.7 km || 
|-id=799 bgcolor=#fefefe
| 111799 ||  || — || February 11, 2002 || Socorro || LINEAR || NYS || align=right | 1.7 km || 
|-id=800 bgcolor=#fefefe
| 111800 ||  || — || February 11, 2002 || Socorro || LINEAR || V || align=right | 1.2 km || 
|}

111801–111900 

|-bgcolor=#d6d6d6
| 111801 ||  || — || February 15, 2002 || Haleakala || NEAT || ALA || align=right | 6.6 km || 
|-id=802 bgcolor=#d6d6d6
| 111802 ||  || — || February 15, 2002 || Socorro || LINEAR || THM || align=right | 5.2 km || 
|-id=803 bgcolor=#fefefe
| 111803 ||  || — || February 15, 2002 || Socorro || LINEAR || — || align=right | 1.7 km || 
|-id=804 bgcolor=#d6d6d6
| 111804 ||  || — || February 4, 2002 || Palomar || NEAT || EOS || align=right | 3.8 km || 
|-id=805 bgcolor=#C2FFFF
| 111805 ||  || — || February 4, 2002 || Palomar || NEAT || L4ERY || align=right | 16 km || 
|-id=806 bgcolor=#C2FFFF
| 111806 ||  || — || February 7, 2002 || Kitt Peak || Spacewatch || L4 || align=right | 10 km || 
|-id=807 bgcolor=#fefefe
| 111807 ||  || — || February 8, 2002 || Anderson Mesa || LONEOS || FLO || align=right | 1.5 km || 
|-id=808 bgcolor=#fefefe
| 111808 ||  || — || February 8, 2002 || Anderson Mesa || LONEOS || — || align=right | 1.6 km || 
|-id=809 bgcolor=#fefefe
| 111809 ||  || — || February 8, 2002 || Socorro || LINEAR || FLO || align=right | 2.8 km || 
|-id=810 bgcolor=#fefefe
| 111810 ||  || — || February 7, 2002 || Socorro || LINEAR || — || align=right | 1.4 km || 
|-id=811 bgcolor=#FA8072
| 111811 ||  || — || February 8, 2002 || Socorro || LINEAR || — || align=right | 2.9 km || 
|-id=812 bgcolor=#d6d6d6
| 111812 ||  || — || February 10, 2002 || Socorro || LINEAR || — || align=right | 5.5 km || 
|-id=813 bgcolor=#d6d6d6
| 111813 ||  || — || February 10, 2002 || Socorro || LINEAR || BRA || align=right | 2.5 km || 
|-id=814 bgcolor=#d6d6d6
| 111814 ||  || — || February 10, 2002 || Kvistaberg || UDAS || KOR || align=right | 2.2 km || 
|-id=815 bgcolor=#d6d6d6
| 111815 ||  || — || February 13, 2002 || Kitt Peak || Spacewatch || — || align=right | 4.6 km || 
|-id=816 bgcolor=#E9E9E9
| 111816 ||  || — || February 15, 2002 || Socorro || LINEAR || MAR || align=right | 2.2 km || 
|-id=817 bgcolor=#d6d6d6
| 111817 || 2002 DF || — || February 16, 2002 || Farpoint || G. Hug || — || align=right | 5.6 km || 
|-id=818 bgcolor=#d6d6d6
| 111818 Deforest || 2002 DT ||  || February 17, 2002 || Needville || J. Dellinger, W. G. Dillon || — || align=right | 5.6 km || 
|-id=819 bgcolor=#C2FFFF
| 111819 ||  || — || February 16, 2002 || Uccle || T. Pauwels || L4 || align=right | 19 km || 
|-id=820 bgcolor=#d6d6d6
| 111820 ||  || — || February 18, 2002 || Cima Ekar || ADAS || ALA || align=right | 5.8 km || 
|-id=821 bgcolor=#fefefe
| 111821 ||  || — || February 19, 2002 || Socorro || LINEAR || H || align=right | 1.3 km || 
|-id=822 bgcolor=#E9E9E9
| 111822 ||  || — || February 17, 2002 || Cordell-Lorenz || D. T. Durig || RAF || align=right | 2.4 km || 
|-id=823 bgcolor=#fefefe
| 111823 ||  || — || February 19, 2002 || Socorro || LINEAR || H || align=right | 1.1 km || 
|-id=824 bgcolor=#fefefe
| 111824 ||  || — || February 22, 2002 || Socorro || LINEAR || H || align=right | 1.3 km || 
|-id=825 bgcolor=#d6d6d6
| 111825 ||  || — || February 16, 2002 || Palomar || NEAT || — || align=right | 5.6 km || 
|-id=826 bgcolor=#fefefe
| 111826 ||  || — || February 22, 2002 || Palomar || NEAT || V || align=right | 1.3 km || 
|-id=827 bgcolor=#E9E9E9
| 111827 ||  || — || March 5, 2002 || Socorro || LINEAR || GAL || align=right | 3.3 km || 
|-id=828 bgcolor=#fefefe
| 111828 ||  || — || March 5, 2002 || Socorro || LINEAR || H || align=right | 1.1 km || 
|-id=829 bgcolor=#fefefe
| 111829 ||  || — || March 12, 2002 || Črni Vrh || Črni Vrh || V || align=right | 1.1 km || 
|-id=830 bgcolor=#fefefe
| 111830 ||  || — || March 14, 2002 || Prescott || P. G. Comba || — || align=right | 1.2 km || 
|-id=831 bgcolor=#FA8072
| 111831 ||  || — || March 14, 2002 || Socorro || LINEAR || H || align=right | 2.3 km || 
|-id=832 bgcolor=#fefefe
| 111832 ||  || — || March 13, 2002 || Socorro || LINEAR || H || align=right | 1.2 km || 
|-id=833 bgcolor=#fefefe
| 111833 ||  || — || March 14, 2002 || Desert Eagle || W. K. Y. Yeung || — || align=right | 1.5 km || 
|-id=834 bgcolor=#d6d6d6
| 111834 ||  || — || March 5, 2002 || Socorro || LINEAR || — || align=right | 5.7 km || 
|-id=835 bgcolor=#fefefe
| 111835 ||  || — || March 6, 2002 || Palomar || NEAT || H || align=right data-sort-value="0.85" | 850 m || 
|-id=836 bgcolor=#fefefe
| 111836 ||  || — || March 9, 2002 || Socorro || LINEAR || — || align=right | 1.8 km || 
|-id=837 bgcolor=#fefefe
| 111837 ||  || — || March 9, 2002 || Socorro || LINEAR || FLO || align=right | 1.3 km || 
|-id=838 bgcolor=#fefefe
| 111838 ||  || — || March 10, 2002 || Palomar || NEAT || — || align=right | 2.3 km || 
|-id=839 bgcolor=#E9E9E9
| 111839 ||  || — || March 10, 2002 || Haleakala || NEAT || — || align=right | 2.2 km || 
|-id=840 bgcolor=#fefefe
| 111840 ||  || — || March 10, 2002 || Haleakala || NEAT || — || align=right | 1.3 km || 
|-id=841 bgcolor=#fefefe
| 111841 ||  || — || March 10, 2002 || Anderson Mesa || LONEOS || — || align=right | 1.4 km || 
|-id=842 bgcolor=#fefefe
| 111842 ||  || — || March 9, 2002 || Socorro || LINEAR || — || align=right | 1.7 km || 
|-id=843 bgcolor=#fefefe
| 111843 ||  || — || March 9, 2002 || Socorro || LINEAR || NYS || align=right | 1.5 km || 
|-id=844 bgcolor=#fefefe
| 111844 ||  || — || March 9, 2002 || Socorro || LINEAR || — || align=right | 1.8 km || 
|-id=845 bgcolor=#fefefe
| 111845 ||  || — || March 9, 2002 || Socorro || LINEAR || — || align=right | 1.3 km || 
|-id=846 bgcolor=#fefefe
| 111846 ||  || — || March 9, 2002 || Palomar || NEAT || MAS || align=right | 1.2 km || 
|-id=847 bgcolor=#E9E9E9
| 111847 ||  || — || March 9, 2002 || Kitt Peak || Spacewatch || — || align=right | 2.0 km || 
|-id=848 bgcolor=#fefefe
| 111848 ||  || — || March 9, 2002 || Socorro || LINEAR || FLO || align=right | 1.5 km || 
|-id=849 bgcolor=#E9E9E9
| 111849 ||  || — || March 9, 2002 || Socorro || LINEAR || — || align=right | 4.3 km || 
|-id=850 bgcolor=#d6d6d6
| 111850 ||  || — || March 12, 2002 || Socorro || LINEAR || — || align=right | 7.0 km || 
|-id=851 bgcolor=#fefefe
| 111851 ||  || — || March 12, 2002 || Palomar || NEAT || — || align=right data-sort-value="0.89" | 890 m || 
|-id=852 bgcolor=#d6d6d6
| 111852 ||  || — || March 13, 2002 || Socorro || LINEAR || — || align=right | 7.0 km || 
|-id=853 bgcolor=#fefefe
| 111853 ||  || — || March 13, 2002 || Socorro || LINEAR || — || align=right | 1.1 km || 
|-id=854 bgcolor=#fefefe
| 111854 ||  || — || March 13, 2002 || Socorro || LINEAR || NYS || align=right | 1.2 km || 
|-id=855 bgcolor=#d6d6d6
| 111855 ||  || — || March 13, 2002 || Socorro || LINEAR || — || align=right | 5.8 km || 
|-id=856 bgcolor=#fefefe
| 111856 ||  || — || March 13, 2002 || Socorro || LINEAR || — || align=right | 1.6 km || 
|-id=857 bgcolor=#fefefe
| 111857 ||  || — || March 13, 2002 || Socorro || LINEAR || V || align=right | 2.0 km || 
|-id=858 bgcolor=#fefefe
| 111858 ||  || — || March 13, 2002 || Socorro || LINEAR || NYS || align=right | 4.0 km || 
|-id=859 bgcolor=#E9E9E9
| 111859 ||  || — || March 13, 2002 || Socorro || LINEAR || — || align=right | 4.4 km || 
|-id=860 bgcolor=#fefefe
| 111860 ||  || — || March 13, 2002 || Socorro || LINEAR || EUT || align=right | 1.5 km || 
|-id=861 bgcolor=#fefefe
| 111861 ||  || — || March 13, 2002 || Palomar || NEAT || — || align=right | 1.5 km || 
|-id=862 bgcolor=#fefefe
| 111862 ||  || — || March 9, 2002 || Socorro || LINEAR || — || align=right | 1.8 km || 
|-id=863 bgcolor=#fefefe
| 111863 ||  || — || March 9, 2002 || Socorro || LINEAR || — || align=right | 2.2 km || 
|-id=864 bgcolor=#E9E9E9
| 111864 ||  || — || March 9, 2002 || Socorro || LINEAR || — || align=right | 2.1 km || 
|-id=865 bgcolor=#E9E9E9
| 111865 ||  || — || March 9, 2002 || Socorro || LINEAR || — || align=right | 3.2 km || 
|-id=866 bgcolor=#d6d6d6
| 111866 ||  || — || March 12, 2002 || Socorro || LINEAR || — || align=right | 8.0 km || 
|-id=867 bgcolor=#FA8072
| 111867 ||  || — || March 12, 2002 || Socorro || LINEAR || H || align=right | 1.1 km || 
|-id=868 bgcolor=#fefefe
| 111868 ||  || — || March 12, 2002 || Socorro || LINEAR || FLO || align=right | 1.2 km || 
|-id=869 bgcolor=#fefefe
| 111869 ||  || — || March 12, 2002 || Socorro || LINEAR || NYS || align=right | 1.5 km || 
|-id=870 bgcolor=#fefefe
| 111870 ||  || — || March 12, 2002 || Socorro || LINEAR || — || align=right | 1.4 km || 
|-id=871 bgcolor=#fefefe
| 111871 ||  || — || March 11, 2002 || Socorro || LINEAR || FLO || align=right | 1.4 km || 
|-id=872 bgcolor=#fefefe
| 111872 ||  || — || March 5, 2002 || Anderson Mesa || LONEOS || — || align=right | 1.3 km || 
|-id=873 bgcolor=#d6d6d6
| 111873 ||  || — || March 6, 2002 || Socorro || LINEAR || — || align=right | 5.6 km || 
|-id=874 bgcolor=#fefefe
| 111874 ||  || — || March 6, 2002 || Palomar || NEAT || FLO || align=right | 1.1 km || 
|-id=875 bgcolor=#E9E9E9
| 111875 ||  || — || March 6, 2002 || Socorro || LINEAR || — || align=right | 4.2 km || 
|-id=876 bgcolor=#E9E9E9
| 111876 ||  || — || March 9, 2002 || Anderson Mesa || LONEOS || AGN || align=right | 2.5 km || 
|-id=877 bgcolor=#fefefe
| 111877 ||  || — || March 9, 2002 || Anderson Mesa || LONEOS || V || align=right | 1.1 km || 
|-id=878 bgcolor=#E9E9E9
| 111878 ||  || — || March 9, 2002 || Socorro || LINEAR || — || align=right | 2.0 km || 
|-id=879 bgcolor=#fefefe
| 111879 ||  || — || March 10, 2002 || Anderson Mesa || LONEOS || V || align=right | 1.5 km || 
|-id=880 bgcolor=#fefefe
| 111880 ||  || — || March 10, 2002 || Haleakala || NEAT || FLO || align=right | 1.5 km || 
|-id=881 bgcolor=#fefefe
| 111881 ||  || — || March 12, 2002 || Socorro || LINEAR || — || align=right | 1.3 km || 
|-id=882 bgcolor=#d6d6d6
| 111882 ||  || — || March 12, 2002 || Anderson Mesa || LONEOS || — || align=right | 6.8 km || 
|-id=883 bgcolor=#fefefe
| 111883 ||  || — || March 13, 2002 || Kitt Peak || Spacewatch || — || align=right | 2.0 km || 
|-id=884 bgcolor=#fefefe
| 111884 ||  || — || March 14, 2002 || Anderson Mesa || LONEOS || — || align=right | 1.0 km || 
|-id=885 bgcolor=#d6d6d6
| 111885 ||  || — || March 12, 2002 || Kitt Peak || Spacewatch || HIL3:2 || align=right | 13 km || 
|-id=886 bgcolor=#fefefe
| 111886 ||  || — || March 12, 2002 || Palomar || NEAT || — || align=right data-sort-value="0.75" | 750 m || 
|-id=887 bgcolor=#E9E9E9
| 111887 ||  || — || March 14, 2002 || Palomar || NEAT || — || align=right | 3.5 km || 
|-id=888 bgcolor=#fefefe
| 111888 ||  || — || March 15, 2002 || Palomar || NEAT || NYS || align=right | 1.2 km || 
|-id=889 bgcolor=#fefefe
| 111889 ||  || — || March 13, 2002 || Palomar || NEAT || — || align=right | 1.4 km || 
|-id=890 bgcolor=#fefefe
| 111890 ||  || — || March 15, 2002 || Palomar || NEAT || MAS || align=right | 1.7 km || 
|-id=891 bgcolor=#d6d6d6
| 111891 ||  || — || March 19, 2002 || Fountain Hills || Fountain Hills Obs. || ALA || align=right | 11 km || 
|-id=892 bgcolor=#fefefe
| 111892 ||  || — || March 19, 2002 || Desert Eagle || W. K. Y. Yeung || — || align=right | 1.4 km || 
|-id=893 bgcolor=#fefefe
| 111893 ||  || — || March 19, 2002 || Desert Eagle || W. K. Y. Yeung || — || align=right | 1.6 km || 
|-id=894 bgcolor=#fefefe
| 111894 ||  || — || March 16, 2002 || Socorro || LINEAR || — || align=right | 1.5 km || 
|-id=895 bgcolor=#fefefe
| 111895 ||  || — || March 17, 2002 || Socorro || LINEAR || H || align=right | 1.3 km || 
|-id=896 bgcolor=#fefefe
| 111896 ||  || — || March 20, 2002 || Desert Eagle || W. K. Y. Yeung || — || align=right | 1.7 km || 
|-id=897 bgcolor=#fefefe
| 111897 ||  || — || March 20, 2002 || Desert Eagle || W. K. Y. Yeung || FLO || align=right | 1.6 km || 
|-id=898 bgcolor=#fefefe
| 111898 ||  || — || March 20, 2002 || Socorro || LINEAR || H || align=right | 1.1 km || 
|-id=899 bgcolor=#fefefe
| 111899 ||  || — || March 16, 2002 || Socorro || LINEAR || — || align=right | 1.5 km || 
|-id=900 bgcolor=#fefefe
| 111900 ||  || — || March 16, 2002 || Haleakala || NEAT || V || align=right | 1.6 km || 
|}

111901–112000 

|-bgcolor=#fefefe
| 111901 ||  || — || March 17, 2002 || Haleakala || NEAT || — || align=right | 1.9 km || 
|-id=902 bgcolor=#fefefe
| 111902 ||  || — || March 20, 2002 || Socorro || LINEAR || — || align=right | 1.5 km || 
|-id=903 bgcolor=#d6d6d6
| 111903 ||  || — || March 20, 2002 || Socorro || LINEAR || URS || align=right | 7.5 km || 
|-id=904 bgcolor=#E9E9E9
| 111904 ||  || — || March 20, 2002 || Palomar || NEAT || — || align=right | 4.2 km || 
|-id=905 bgcolor=#fefefe
| 111905 ||  || — || March 19, 2002 || Anderson Mesa || LONEOS || — || align=right | 1.3 km || 
|-id=906 bgcolor=#E9E9E9
| 111906 ||  || — || March 20, 2002 || Socorro || LINEAR || — || align=right | 5.0 km || 
|-id=907 bgcolor=#fefefe
| 111907 ||  || — || March 20, 2002 || Socorro || LINEAR || V || align=right | 1.3 km || 
|-id=908 bgcolor=#fefefe
| 111908 ||  || — || March 20, 2002 || Socorro || LINEAR || NYS || align=right | 1.4 km || 
|-id=909 bgcolor=#fefefe
| 111909 ||  || — || March 20, 2002 || Anderson Mesa || LONEOS || NYS || align=right | 1.2 km || 
|-id=910 bgcolor=#fefefe
| 111910 ||  || — || March 20, 2002 || Anderson Mesa || LONEOS || — || align=right | 1.6 km || 
|-id=911 bgcolor=#d6d6d6
| 111911 ||  || — || March 21, 2002 || Desert Eagle || W. K. Y. Yeung || — || align=right | 6.0 km || 
|-id=912 bgcolor=#fefefe
| 111912 ||  || — || March 16, 2002 || Socorro || LINEAR || — || align=right | 1.5 km || 
|-id=913 bgcolor=#d6d6d6
| 111913 Davidgans || 2002 GD ||  || April 1, 2002 || Kleť || KLENOT || — || align=right | 6.2 km || 
|-id=914 bgcolor=#fefefe
| 111914 ||  || — || April 4, 2002 || Socorro || LINEAR || H || align=right | 1.2 km || 
|-id=915 bgcolor=#fefefe
| 111915 ||  || — || April 8, 2002 || Palomar || NEAT || — || align=right | 3.0 km || 
|-id=916 bgcolor=#fefefe
| 111916 ||  || — || April 10, 2002 || Socorro || LINEAR || FLO || align=right | 1.1 km || 
|-id=917 bgcolor=#E9E9E9
| 111917 ||  || — || April 15, 2002 || Desert Eagle || W. K. Y. Yeung || — || align=right | 2.3 km || 
|-id=918 bgcolor=#fefefe
| 111918 ||  || — || April 10, 2002 || Socorro || LINEAR || — || align=right | 1.3 km || 
|-id=919 bgcolor=#fefefe
| 111919 ||  || — || April 14, 2002 || Desert Eagle || W. K. Y. Yeung || V || align=right | 1.2 km || 
|-id=920 bgcolor=#E9E9E9
| 111920 ||  || — || April 15, 2002 || Desert Eagle || W. K. Y. Yeung || — || align=right | 5.0 km || 
|-id=921 bgcolor=#fefefe
| 111921 ||  || — || April 14, 2002 || Socorro || LINEAR || FLO || align=right data-sort-value="0.92" | 920 m || 
|-id=922 bgcolor=#fefefe
| 111922 ||  || — || April 15, 2002 || Socorro || LINEAR || — || align=right | 1.5 km || 
|-id=923 bgcolor=#fefefe
| 111923 ||  || — || April 15, 2002 || Socorro || LINEAR || — || align=right | 2.1 km || 
|-id=924 bgcolor=#fefefe
| 111924 ||  || — || April 14, 2002 || Socorro || LINEAR || — || align=right | 2.2 km || 
|-id=925 bgcolor=#fefefe
| 111925 ||  || — || April 14, 2002 || Socorro || LINEAR || — || align=right data-sort-value="0.96" | 960 m || 
|-id=926 bgcolor=#fefefe
| 111926 ||  || — || April 14, 2002 || Socorro || LINEAR || — || align=right | 1.7 km || 
|-id=927 bgcolor=#fefefe
| 111927 ||  || — || April 14, 2002 || Socorro || LINEAR || V || align=right | 1.3 km || 
|-id=928 bgcolor=#d6d6d6
| 111928 ||  || — || April 15, 2002 || Socorro || LINEAR || 3:2 || align=right | 12 km || 
|-id=929 bgcolor=#fefefe
| 111929 ||  || — || April 15, 2002 || Palomar || NEAT || FLO || align=right | 1.3 km || 
|-id=930 bgcolor=#fefefe
| 111930 ||  || — || April 12, 2002 || Socorro || LINEAR || V || align=right | 1.7 km || 
|-id=931 bgcolor=#fefefe
| 111931 ||  || — || April 14, 2002 || Socorro || LINEAR || FLO || align=right | 1.4 km || 
|-id=932 bgcolor=#C2FFFF
| 111932 ||  || — || April 1, 2002 || Palomar || NEAT || L4 || align=right | 15 km || 
|-id=933 bgcolor=#d6d6d6
| 111933 Alphonsetardif ||  ||  || April 3, 2002 || Kitt Peak || Spacewatch || INA || align=right | 5.0 km || 
|-id=934 bgcolor=#fefefe
| 111934 ||  || — || April 2, 2002 || Palomar || NEAT || H || align=right | 1.5 km || 
|-id=935 bgcolor=#E9E9E9
| 111935 ||  || — || April 4, 2002 || Palomar || NEAT || — || align=right | 2.6 km || 
|-id=936 bgcolor=#fefefe
| 111936 ||  || — || April 4, 2002 || Palomar || NEAT || — || align=right | 1.3 km || 
|-id=937 bgcolor=#fefefe
| 111937 ||  || — || April 4, 2002 || Palomar || NEAT || FLO || align=right | 1.3 km || 
|-id=938 bgcolor=#E9E9E9
| 111938 ||  || — || April 4, 2002 || Palomar || NEAT || — || align=right | 3.7 km || 
|-id=939 bgcolor=#fefefe
| 111939 ||  || — || April 4, 2002 || Palomar || NEAT || — || align=right | 1.4 km || 
|-id=940 bgcolor=#fefefe
| 111940 ||  || — || April 4, 2002 || Haleakala || NEAT || KLI || align=right | 4.1 km || 
|-id=941 bgcolor=#fefefe
| 111941 ||  || — || April 4, 2002 || Palomar || NEAT || — || align=right | 1.9 km || 
|-id=942 bgcolor=#fefefe
| 111942 ||  || — || April 5, 2002 || Anderson Mesa || LONEOS || — || align=right | 1.6 km || 
|-id=943 bgcolor=#fefefe
| 111943 ||  || — || April 5, 2002 || Palomar || NEAT || NYS || align=right | 1.5 km || 
|-id=944 bgcolor=#fefefe
| 111944 ||  || — || April 5, 2002 || Palomar || NEAT || — || align=right | 1.7 km || 
|-id=945 bgcolor=#fefefe
| 111945 ||  || — || April 5, 2002 || Anderson Mesa || LONEOS || — || align=right | 1.3 km || 
|-id=946 bgcolor=#d6d6d6
| 111946 ||  || — || April 5, 2002 || Anderson Mesa || LONEOS || — || align=right | 8.9 km || 
|-id=947 bgcolor=#fefefe
| 111947 ||  || — || April 5, 2002 || Palomar || NEAT || — || align=right | 1.7 km || 
|-id=948 bgcolor=#fefefe
| 111948 ||  || — || April 5, 2002 || Palomar || NEAT || — || align=right | 2.3 km || 
|-id=949 bgcolor=#d6d6d6
| 111949 ||  || — || April 8, 2002 || Palomar || NEAT || — || align=right | 3.6 km || 
|-id=950 bgcolor=#d6d6d6
| 111950 ||  || — || April 8, 2002 || Palomar || NEAT || — || align=right | 6.1 km || 
|-id=951 bgcolor=#fefefe
| 111951 ||  || — || April 8, 2002 || Kitt Peak || Spacewatch || MAS || align=right | 1.6 km || 
|-id=952 bgcolor=#fefefe
| 111952 ||  || — || April 8, 2002 || Palomar || NEAT || — || align=right | 1.3 km || 
|-id=953 bgcolor=#fefefe
| 111953 ||  || — || April 8, 2002 || Palomar || NEAT || — || align=right | 1.8 km || 
|-id=954 bgcolor=#fefefe
| 111954 ||  || — || April 8, 2002 || Palomar || NEAT || — || align=right | 1.5 km || 
|-id=955 bgcolor=#E9E9E9
| 111955 ||  || — || April 8, 2002 || Palomar || NEAT || — || align=right | 2.3 km || 
|-id=956 bgcolor=#fefefe
| 111956 ||  || — || April 8, 2002 || Palomar || NEAT || — || align=right | 1.1 km || 
|-id=957 bgcolor=#fefefe
| 111957 ||  || — || April 8, 2002 || Palomar || NEAT || — || align=right | 2.2 km || 
|-id=958 bgcolor=#fefefe
| 111958 ||  || — || April 9, 2002 || Anderson Mesa || LONEOS || — || align=right | 1.7 km || 
|-id=959 bgcolor=#fefefe
| 111959 ||  || — || April 9, 2002 || Anderson Mesa || LONEOS || — || align=right | 1.6 km || 
|-id=960 bgcolor=#fefefe
| 111960 ||  || — || April 9, 2002 || Palomar || NEAT || MAS || align=right | 1.3 km || 
|-id=961 bgcolor=#fefefe
| 111961 ||  || — || April 9, 2002 || Socorro || LINEAR || — || align=right | 1.6 km || 
|-id=962 bgcolor=#fefefe
| 111962 ||  || — || April 9, 2002 || Socorro || LINEAR || FLO || align=right | 1.4 km || 
|-id=963 bgcolor=#fefefe
| 111963 ||  || — || April 9, 2002 || Socorro || LINEAR || — || align=right | 1.7 km || 
|-id=964 bgcolor=#E9E9E9
| 111964 ||  || — || April 9, 2002 || Socorro || LINEAR || — || align=right | 1.9 km || 
|-id=965 bgcolor=#fefefe
| 111965 ||  || — || April 9, 2002 || Socorro || LINEAR || — || align=right | 1.7 km || 
|-id=966 bgcolor=#E9E9E9
| 111966 ||  || — || April 10, 2002 || Socorro || LINEAR || — || align=right | 1.8 km || 
|-id=967 bgcolor=#fefefe
| 111967 ||  || — || April 10, 2002 || Socorro || LINEAR || — || align=right | 1.7 km || 
|-id=968 bgcolor=#fefefe
| 111968 ||  || — || April 10, 2002 || Socorro || LINEAR || V || align=right | 1.2 km || 
|-id=969 bgcolor=#fefefe
| 111969 ||  || — || April 10, 2002 || Socorro || LINEAR || V || align=right | 1.2 km || 
|-id=970 bgcolor=#fefefe
| 111970 ||  || — || April 10, 2002 || Socorro || LINEAR || LCI || align=right | 1.9 km || 
|-id=971 bgcolor=#E9E9E9
| 111971 ||  || — || April 10, 2002 || Socorro || LINEAR || — || align=right | 3.0 km || 
|-id=972 bgcolor=#fefefe
| 111972 ||  || — || April 10, 2002 || Socorro || LINEAR || V || align=right | 1.4 km || 
|-id=973 bgcolor=#fefefe
| 111973 ||  || — || April 10, 2002 || Socorro || LINEAR || — || align=right | 1.5 km || 
|-id=974 bgcolor=#fefefe
| 111974 ||  || — || April 10, 2002 || Socorro || LINEAR || — || align=right | 1.8 km || 
|-id=975 bgcolor=#fefefe
| 111975 ||  || — || April 10, 2002 || Socorro || LINEAR || PHO || align=right | 2.0 km || 
|-id=976 bgcolor=#fefefe
| 111976 ||  || — || April 9, 2002 || Socorro || LINEAR || V || align=right | 1.3 km || 
|-id=977 bgcolor=#E9E9E9
| 111977 ||  || — || April 9, 2002 || Socorro || LINEAR || MAR || align=right | 2.2 km || 
|-id=978 bgcolor=#fefefe
| 111978 ||  || — || April 9, 2002 || Socorro || LINEAR || FLO || align=right | 1.2 km || 
|-id=979 bgcolor=#fefefe
| 111979 ||  || — || April 9, 2002 || Socorro || LINEAR || — || align=right data-sort-value="0.96" | 960 m || 
|-id=980 bgcolor=#fefefe
| 111980 ||  || — || April 9, 2002 || Socorro || LINEAR || — || align=right | 1.4 km || 
|-id=981 bgcolor=#d6d6d6
| 111981 ||  || — || April 9, 2002 || Socorro || LINEAR || — || align=right | 6.3 km || 
|-id=982 bgcolor=#fefefe
| 111982 ||  || — || April 9, 2002 || Socorro || LINEAR || — || align=right | 1.6 km || 
|-id=983 bgcolor=#fefefe
| 111983 ||  || — || April 9, 2002 || Socorro || LINEAR || — || align=right | 3.3 km || 
|-id=984 bgcolor=#fefefe
| 111984 ||  || — || April 9, 2002 || Socorro || LINEAR || FLO || align=right | 1.4 km || 
|-id=985 bgcolor=#fefefe
| 111985 ||  || — || April 9, 2002 || Socorro || LINEAR || FLO || align=right data-sort-value="0.97" | 970 m || 
|-id=986 bgcolor=#fefefe
| 111986 ||  || — || April 9, 2002 || Socorro || LINEAR || — || align=right | 1.5 km || 
|-id=987 bgcolor=#E9E9E9
| 111987 ||  || — || April 9, 2002 || Socorro || LINEAR || — || align=right | 3.3 km || 
|-id=988 bgcolor=#d6d6d6
| 111988 ||  || — || April 9, 2002 || Socorro || LINEAR || MEL || align=right | 7.9 km || 
|-id=989 bgcolor=#fefefe
| 111989 ||  || — || April 9, 2002 || Socorro || LINEAR || NYS || align=right data-sort-value="0.79" | 790 m || 
|-id=990 bgcolor=#fefefe
| 111990 ||  || — || April 10, 2002 || Socorro || LINEAR || — || align=right | 1.1 km || 
|-id=991 bgcolor=#fefefe
| 111991 ||  || — || April 11, 2002 || Socorro || LINEAR || — || align=right | 1.5 km || 
|-id=992 bgcolor=#fefefe
| 111992 ||  || — || April 10, 2002 || Socorro || LINEAR || FLO || align=right | 1.3 km || 
|-id=993 bgcolor=#fefefe
| 111993 ||  || — || April 10, 2002 || Socorro || LINEAR || — || align=right | 1.5 km || 
|-id=994 bgcolor=#fefefe
| 111994 ||  || — || April 10, 2002 || Socorro || LINEAR || V || align=right | 1.3 km || 
|-id=995 bgcolor=#d6d6d6
| 111995 ||  || — || April 11, 2002 || Socorro || LINEAR || 3:2 || align=right | 9.1 km || 
|-id=996 bgcolor=#fefefe
| 111996 ||  || — || April 11, 2002 || Socorro || LINEAR || — || align=right | 1.4 km || 
|-id=997 bgcolor=#fefefe
| 111997 ||  || — || April 12, 2002 || Socorro || LINEAR || H || align=right data-sort-value="0.90" | 900 m || 
|-id=998 bgcolor=#fefefe
| 111998 ||  || — || April 12, 2002 || Socorro || LINEAR || NYS || align=right | 2.1 km || 
|-id=999 bgcolor=#fefefe
| 111999 ||  || — || April 12, 2002 || Socorro || LINEAR || — || align=right | 1.7 km || 
|-id=000 bgcolor=#fefefe
| 112000 ||  || — || April 12, 2002 || Socorro || LINEAR || FLO || align=right | 1.1 km || 
|}

References

External links 
 Discovery Circumstances: Numbered Minor Planets (110001)–(115000) (IAU Minor Planet Center)

0111